= Wolfram's 2-state 3-symbol Turing machine =

Mathematical model of abstract computation

In his book A New Kind of Science, Stephen Wolfram described a universal 2-state 5-symbol Turing machine, and conjectured that a particular 2-state 3-symbol Turing machine (hereinafter (2,3) Turing machine) might be universal as well.

On 14 May 2007, Wolfram announced a $25,000 prize to be won by the first person to prove or disprove the universality of the (2,3) Turing machine. On 24 October 2007, it was announced that the prize had been won by Alex Smith, a student in electronics and computing at the University of Birmingham, for his proof that it was "universal". Since the proof applies to a non-standard Turing machine model which allows infinite, non-periodic initial configurations and never halts it is categorized by some as "weak-universal".

== Background ==
Claude Shannon first explicitly posed the question of finding the smallest possible universal Turing machine in 1956. He showed that two symbols were sufficient so long as enough states were used (or vice versa), and that it was always possible to exchange states for symbols.

Minsky (1967) briefly argued that standard (2,2) machines cannot be universal and M. Margenstern (2010) provided a mathematical proof based on a result by L. Pavlotskaya in 1973 (not published but mentioned in Margenstern article). These proofs apply to normal Turing machine models in which the machine is given a finite input and must halt when it completes. Wolfram's machine does not satisfy either of these constraints.

There are a number of common variations of Turing machine models commonly used by computer scientists. These variations commonly include number of tapes, whether the tape(s) are two-way infinite or only one-way infinite, whether the machine head is allowed to stay put, or must move after each transition, whether or not a TM instruction can both move the head and write a symbol on the same step, etc. For each such model, there will be a different "smallest possible universal Turing machine". So, Wolfram's machine is only the "smallest possible universal Turing machine" for its (particularly nonstandard) model.

== Description ==
The following table indicates the actions to be performed by the Turing machine depending on whether its current state is A or B, and the symbol currently being read is 0, 1 or 2. The table entries indicate the symbol to be printed, the direction in which the tape head is to move, and the subsequent state of the machine.

| | A | B |
|---|---|---|
| 0 | P1,R,B | P2,L,A |
| 1 | P2,L,A | P2,R,B |
| 2 | P1,L,A | P0,R,A |

The (2,3) Turing machine:

- Has no halt state;
- Is trivially related to 23 other machines by interchange of states, symbols and directions.

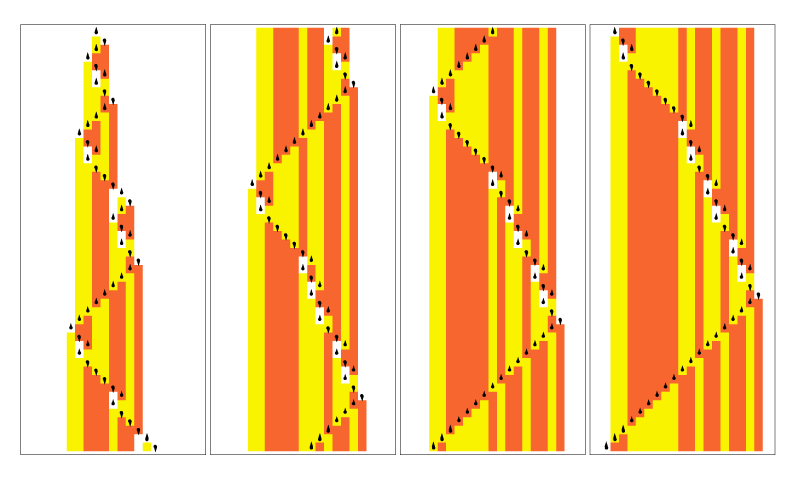

The state of the head (up or down droplet (A and B respectively)) and the pattern of color (white, yellow and orange (0,1, and 2 respectively)) in a given row depends solely on the content of the row immediately above it.

Even though the machine has a head with only two states, and a tape that can hold only three colors (depending on the initial content of the tape), the machine's output can still be arbitrarily complex.

== Proof of universality ==
On 24 October 2007, it was announced by Wolfram Research that Alex Smith, a student in electronics and computing at the University of Birmingham (UK), proved that the (2,3) Turing machine is universal and thus won Wolfram's prize described above.

The proof showed that the machine is equivalent to a variant of a tag system already known to be universal. Smith first constructed a sequence of rule systems showing that the (2,3) Turing machine is capable of arbitrary finite computations. He then employed a novel approach to extend that construction to unbounded computations. The proof proceeds in two stages. The first part emulates the finite evolution of any two-color cyclic tag system. The emulation is a composite of a series of emulations involving the indexed rule systems 'system 0' through 'system 5'. Each rule system emulates the next one in the sequence. Smith then showed that even though the initial condition of the (2,3) Turing machine is not repetitive, the construction of that initial condition is not universal. Hence the (2,3) Turing machine is universal.

Wolfram claims that Smith's proof is another piece of evidence for Wolfram's general "Principle of Computational Equivalence" (PCE). That principle states that if one sees behavior that is not obviously simple, the behavior will correspond to a computation that is in a sense "maximally sophisticated". Smith's proof has unleashed a debate on the precise operational conditions a Turing machine must satisfy in order for it to be candidate universal machine.

A universal (2,3) Turing machine has conceivable applications. For instance, a machine that small and simple can be embedded or constructed using a small number of particles or molecules. But the "compiler" Smith's algorithm implies does not produce compact or efficient code, at least for anything but the simplest cases. Hence the resulting code tends to be astronomically large and very inefficient. Whether there exist more efficient codings enabling the (2,3) Turing machine to compute more rapidly is an open question.

=== Dispute ===
The announcement that Alex Smith's proof had won was made without the approval of the judging committee, as noted by Martin Davis, a member of the committee, in a post to the FOM mailing list:

"As far as I know, no member of the committee has passed on the validity of this 40 page proof. The determination that Smith's proof is correct seems to have been made entirely by the Wolfram organization. My understanding is that the I/O involves complex encodings."

Vaughan Pratt subsequently disputed the correctness of this proof in a post to the mailing list, noting that similar techniques would allow a linear bounded automaton (or LBA) to be universal, which would contradict a known non-universality result due to Noam Chomsky. Alex Smith joined the mailing list after this message and replied on the following day explaining that an LBA would require to be restarted manually to become universal using the same initial configuration, while his construction restarts the Turing machine automatically with no external intervention. Discussions about the proof continued for some time between Alex Smith, Vaughan Pratt, and others.

=== Publication ===
Smith's proof was finally published in Wolfram's journal Complex Systems in 2020.

== See also ==
- Turing completeness — the ability of simulating any Turing machine
- Rule 110 — a Turing complete elementary cellular automaton

== Bibliography ==
- Wolfram, S (2002) A New Kind of Science. Wolfram Media.
- Wolfram Research, Inc., "Prize Announced for Determining the Boundaries of Turing Machine Computation". Formal announcement that Alex Smith has won the prize.
- —, Wolfram 2,3 Turing Machine Research Prize. Invitation to contestants.

== Historical reading ==
- Marvin Minsky (1967) Computation: Finite and Infinite Machines. Prentice Hall.
- Turing, A (1937) "On Computable Numbers with an Application to the Entscheidungsproblem," Proceedings of the London Mathematical Society Series 2, 42: 230–265.
- — (1938) "On Computable Numbers, with an Application to the Entscheidungsproblem. A Correction," Proceedings of the London Mathematical Society Series 2, 43: 544–546.
