= Sawtooth (cellular automaton) =

Type of pattern whose population grows without bound but does not tend to infinity

The population growth in Rule 90 starting from a single live cell, measured by Gould's sequence.

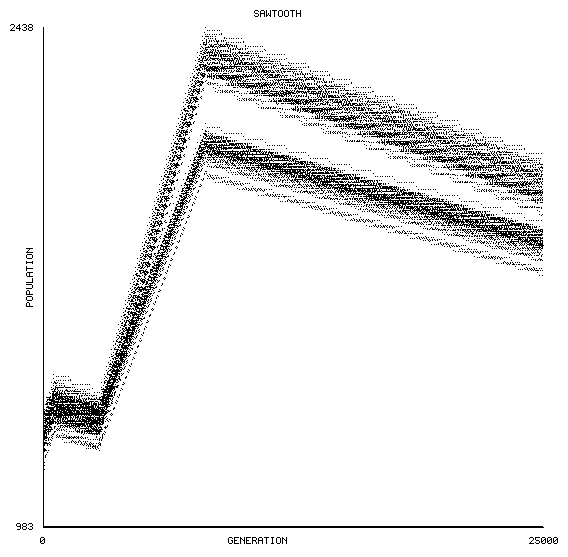
The number of alive cells plotted versus the number of elapsed generations for the first sawtooth discovered in the Game of Life

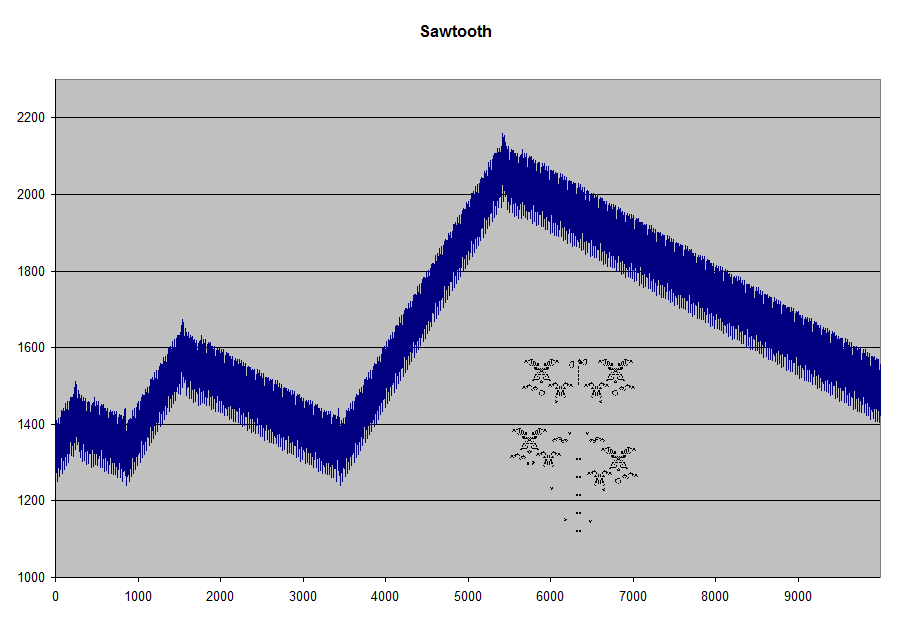
Example of a sawtooth pattern living through several drops below the maximum live cell count. Click on the image to see the cell pattern.

In a cellular automaton, a finite pattern is called a sawtooth if its population grows without bound but does not tend to infinity. In other words, a sawtooth is a pattern with population that reaches new heights infinitely often, but also infinitely often drops below some fixed value. Their name comes from the fact that their plot of population versus generation number looks roughly like an ever-increasing sawtooth wave.

== In rules with small replicators ==
For instance, in Rule 90, a one-dimensional elementary cellular automaton, the population size starting from a single live cell follows Gould's sequence, which has a self-similar sawtooth pattern. On each step whose number is a power of two, the population crashes from a high of the step number plus one to a low of only two live cells. As the population grows with this pattern, its live cells trace out the rows of a Sierpinski triangle. The sawtooth shape of this pattern can be used to recognize physical processes that behave similarly to Rule 90. In Rule 90 and in many cellular automata such as Highlife, the sawtooth pattern is based on the existence of a small replicator, which in Rule 90 consists of a single live cell.

== In Life ==
In Conway's Game of Life, replicators are large and difficult to construct. Instead, the first sawtooth in Life was constructed by Dean Hickerson in April 1991 by using a loaf tractor beam. For a number of years the least infinitely repeating population of any known sawtooth was 262 ON cells, attained by a sawtooth found by David Bell on July 9, 2005.

== Expansion factor ==
The expansion factor of a sawtooth is the limit of the ratio of successive heights (or equivalently, widths) of the "teeth" in plots of population versus generation number. Some sawtooths do not have an expansion factor under its standard definition because some sawtooths have growth that is not exponentially-spaced.
