= Post machine =

Post machine may refer to:

- Post tag machine, an abstract machine form of a tag system
- Post–Turing machine, a program formulation of a type of Turing machine
- Postage meter, for applying postage to mail

== See also ==
- Emil Leon Post (1897–1954), American mathematician and logician
