= Matthew Cook =

American mathematician

Matthew Cook (born February 7, 1970) is a mathematician and computer scientist who is best known for having proved that the Rule 110 cellular automaton is Turing-complete.

== Biography ==
Cook was born in Morgantown, West Virginia and grew up in Evanston, Illinois. He completed his undergraduate studies at the University of Illinois and the Budapest Semesters in Mathematics program. In 1987, Cook qualified as a member of the six-person US team to the International Mathematical Olympiad and won a bronze medal. In 1990, Cook went to work for Wolfram Research, makers of the computer algebra system Mathematica. He did his doctoral work in Computation and Neural Systems at Caltech from 1999 to 2005. Until December 2024, he was a lecturer at the Institute of Neuroinformatics at the University of Zurich and ETH Zurich in Switzerland. He is currently a full professor at the University of Groningen.

== Work with Stephen Wolfram ==
In the 1990s Cook worked as a research assistant to Stephen Wolfram, assisting with work on Wolfram's book, A New Kind of Science. Among other things, he developed a proof showing that the Rule 110 cellular automaton is Turing-complete.

Cook presented his proof at the Santa Fe Institute conference CA98 before the publishing of Wolfram's book—an action that led Wolfram Research to accuse Cook of violating his NDA and resulted in the blocking of the publication of the proof in the conference proceedings.

A New Kind of Science was released in 2002 with an outline of the proof. In 2004, Cook published his proof in Wolfram's journal Complex Systems.
