= Rule 184 =

Elementary cellular automaton

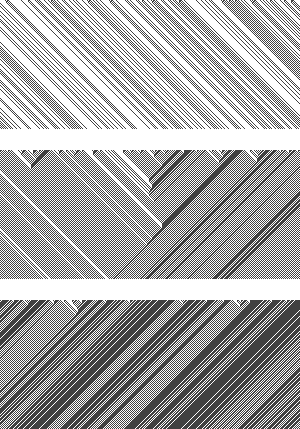
Rule 184, run for 128 steps from random configurations with each of three different starting densities: top 25%, middle 50%, bottom 75%. The view shown is a 300-pixel crop from a wider simulation.

Rule 184 is a one-dimensional binary cellular automaton rule, notable for solving the majority problem as well as for its ability to simultaneously describe several, seemingly quite different, particle systems:

- Rule 184 can be used as a simple model for traffic flow in a single lane of a highway, and forms the basis for many cellular automaton models of traffic flow with greater sophistication. In this model, particles (representing vehicles) move in a single direction, stopping and starting depending on the cars in front of them. The number of particles remains unchanged throughout the simulation. Because of this application, Rule 184 is sometimes called the "traffic rule".
- Rule 184 also models a form of deposition of particles onto an irregular surface, in which each local minimum of the surface is filled with a particle in each step. At each step of the simulation, the number of particles increases. Once placed, a particle never moves.
- Rule 184 can be understood in terms of ballistic annihilation, a system of particles moving both leftwards and rightwards through a one-dimensional medium. When two such particles collide, they annihilate each other, so that at each step the number of particles remains unchanged or decreases.

The apparent contradiction between these descriptions is resolved by different ways of associating features of the automaton's state with particles.

The name of Rule 184 is a Wolfram code that defines the evolution of its states. The earliest research on Rule 184 is by Li (1987) and Krug & Spohn (1988). In particular, Krug and Spohn already describe all three types of particle system modeled by Rule 184.

== Definition ==
A state of the Rule 184 automaton consists of a one-dimensional array of cells, each containing a binary value (0 or 1). In each step of its evolution, the Rule 184 automaton applies the following rule to each of the cells in the array, simultaneously for all cells, to determine the new state of the cell:

Current pattern	111	110	101	100	011	010	001	000
New state for center cell	1	0	1	1	1	0	0	0

An entry in this table defines the new state of each cell as a function of the previous state and the previous values of the neighboring cells on either side. The name for this rule, Rule 184, is the Wolfram code describing the state table above: the bottom row of the table, 10111000, when viewed as a binary number, is equal to the decimal number 184.

The rule set for Rule 184 may also be described intuitively, in several different ways:

- At each step, whenever there exists in the current state a 1 immediately followed by a 0, these two symbols swap places. Based on this description, Krug & Spohn (1988) call Rule 184 a deterministic version of a "kinetic Ising model with asymmetric spin-exchange dynamics".
- At each step, if a cell with value 1 has a cell with value 0 immediately to its right, the 1 moves rightwards leaving a 0 behind. A 1 with another 1 to its right remains in place, while a 0 that does not have a 1 to its left stays a 0. This description is most apt for the application to traffic flow modeling.
- If a cell has state 0, its new state is taken from the cell to its left. Otherwise, its new state is taken from the cell to its right. That is, each cell can be implemented by a two-way demultiplexer with the two adjacent cells being inputs, and the cell itself acting as the selector line. Each cell's next state is determined by the demultiplexer's output. This operation is closely related to a Fredkin gate.

== Dynamics and majority classification ==
From the descriptions of the rules above, two important properties of its dynamics may immediately be seen. First, in Rule 184, for any finite set of cells with periodic boundary conditions, the number of 1s and the number of 0s in a pattern remains invariant throughout the pattern's evolution. Rule 184 and its reflection are the only nontrivial elementary cellular automata to have this property of number conservation. Similarly, if the density of 1s is well-defined for an infinite array of cells, it remains invariant as the automaton carries out its steps. And second, although Rule 184 is not symmetric under left-right reversal, it does have a different symmetry: reversing left and right and at the same time swapping the roles of the 0 and 1 symbols produces a cellular automaton with the same update rule.

Patterns in Rule 184 typically quickly stabilize, either to a pattern in which the cell states move in lockstep one position leftwards at each step, or to a pattern that moves one position rightwards at each step. Specifically, if the initial density of cells with state 1 is less than 50%, the pattern stabilizes into clusters of cells in state 1, spaced two units apart, with the clusters separated by blocks of cells in state 0. Patterns of this type move rightwards. If, on the other hand, the initial density is greater than 50%, the pattern stabilizes into clusters of cells in state 0, spaced two units apart, with the clusters separated by blocks of cells in state 1, and patterns of this type move leftwards. If the density is exactly 50%, the initial pattern stabilizes (more slowly) to a pattern that can equivalently be viewed as moving either leftwards or rightwards at each step: an alternating sequence of 0s and 1s.

The majority problem is the problem of constructing a cellular automaton that, when run on any finite set of cells, can compute the value held by a majority of its cells. In a sense, Rule 184 solves this problem, as follows. if Rule 184 is run on a finite set of cells with periodic boundary conditions, with an unequal number of 0s and 1s, then each cell will eventually see two consecutive states of the majority value infinitely often, but will see two consecutive states of the minority value only finitely many times. The majority problem cannot be solved perfectly if it is required that all cells eventually stabilize to the majority state but the Rule 184 solution avoids this impossibility result by relaxing the criterion by which the automaton recognizes a majority.

== Probabilistic solution ==
Suppose the initial configuration is a random bi-infinite binary string $x \in \{0,1\} ^{\Z}$ drawn from the Bernoulli distribution, such that probability of $x_i=1$ is equal to $p\in[0,1]$ and the probability of $x_i=0$ is $1-p$. Then one can show that after $n$ iterations of rule 184, probabilities of occurrence of blocks $0, 00, 000$, and $010$, denoted by $P_n(0), P_n(00), P_n(000)$ and $P_n(010)$, are given by

$$\begin{align}
P_n(0)&=1-p
,\\
P_n(00)&=\sum _{j=1}^{n+1} \frac{j}{n+1}{2\,n+2\choose n+1-j}{p}^{n+1-j} \left( 1-p
\right) ^{n+1+j}
,\\
P_n(000)&=\sum _{j=1}^{n+1}\frac{j}{n+1} {2\,n+2\choose n+1-j}{p}^{n+1-j} \left( 1-p \right) ^{n+2+j}
,\\
P_n(010)&=2\, \left( 1-p \right) ^{2}- \left( 2-p \right)
\sum _{j=1}^{n+1} \frac {j}{n+1} {2\,n+2\choose n+1-j}{p}^{n+1-j} \left( 1-p \right) ^{n+1+j}.
\end{align}$$

The remaining probabilities of blocks of length 1, 2 and 3 can be obtained using Kolmogorov consistency conditions,

$$\begin{align}
P(1) &= 1-P(0), \\
P(01) &= P(0) -P(00), \\
P(10) &= P(0) -P(00), \\
P(11) &=  1-2 P(0)+P(00), \\
P(001)&=P(00)-P(000), \\
P(011) &=P(0)-P(00) -P(010), \\
P(100) &=P(00)-P(000), \\
P(101) &=P(0)-2 P(00)+P(000), \\
P(110) & = P(0)-P(00)-P(010),\\
P(111) &=  1-3 P(0) +2 P(00) +P(010).
\end{align}$$

Both $P_n(0)$ and $P_n(1)$ are constant, reflecting the fact that rule 184 is number-conserving (on a finite configuration with periodic boundaries it conserves the number of 1's as well as the number of 0's).

In the limit of $n \to \infty$, the probability of $00$ exhibits behaviour analogous to second-order phase transition,

$$P_{\infty}(00)=\lim_{n \to \infty} P_n(00)=
\left\{\begin{array}{rl}
1-2p, & \text{if } p < \frac{1}{2}, \\
0, & \text{otherwise.}
\end{array}\right.$$

== Traffic flow ==
Rule 184 interpreted as a simulation of traffic flow. Each 1 cell corresponds to a vehicle, and each vehicle moves forward only if it has open space in front of it.

If one interprets each 1-cell in Rule 184 as containing a particle, these particles behave in many ways similarly to automobiles in a single lane of traffic: they move forward at a constant speed if there is open space in front of them, and otherwise they stop. Traffic models such as Rule 184 and its generalizations that discretize both space and time are commonly called particle-hopping models. Although very primitive, the Rule 184 model of traffic flow already predicts some of the familiar emergent features of real traffic: clusters of freely moving cars separated by stretches of open road when traffic is light, and waves of stop-and-go traffic when it is heavy.

It is difficult to pinpoint the first use of Rule 184 for traffic flow simulation, in part because the focus of research in this area has been less on achieving the greatest level of mathematical abstraction and more on verisimilitude: even the earlier papers on cellular automaton based traffic flow simulation typically make the model more complex in order to more accurately simulate real traffic. Nevertheless, Rule 184 is fundamental to traffic simulation by cellular automata. Wang, Kwong & Hui (1998), for instance, state that "the basic cellular automaton model describing a one-dimensional traffic flow problem is rule 184." Nagel (1996) writes "Much work using CA models for traffic is based on this model." Several authors describe one-dimensional models with vehicles moving at multiple speeds; such models degenerate to Rule 184 in the single-speed case. Gaylord & Nishidate (1996) extend the Rule 184 dynamics to two-lane highway traffic with lane changes; their model shares with Rule 184 the property that it is symmetric under simultaneous left-right and 0-1 reversal. Biham, Middleton & Levine (1992) describe a two-dimensional city grid model in which the dynamics of individual lanes of traffic is essentially that of Rule 184. For an in-depth survey of cellular automaton traffic modeling and associated statistical mechanics, see Maerivoet & De Moor (2005) and Chowdhury, Santen & Schadschneider (2000).

When viewing Rule 184 as a traffic model, it is natural to consider the average speed of the vehicles. When the density of traffic is less than 50%, this average speed is simply one unit of distance per unit of time: after the system stabilizes, no car ever slows. However, when the density is a number ρ greater than 1/2, the average speed of traffic is $\tfrac{1-\rho}{\rho}$. Thus, the system exhibits a second-order kinetic phase transition at ρ = 1/2. When Rule 184 is interpreted as a traffic model, and started from a random configuration whose density is at this critical value ρ = 1/2, then the average speed approaches its stationary limit as the square root of the number of steps. Instead, for random configurations whose density is not at the critical value, the approach to the limiting speed is exponential.

== Surface deposition ==
Rule 184 as a model of surface deposition. In a layer of particles forming a diagonally-oriented square lattice, new particles stick in each time step to the local minima of the surface. The cellular automaton states model the local slope of the surface.

As shown in the figure, and as originally described by Krug & Spohn (1988), Rule 184 may be used to model deposition of particles onto a surface. In this model, one has a set of particles that occupy a subset of the positions in a square lattice oriented diagonally (the darker particles in the figure). If a particle is present at some position of the lattice, the lattice positions below and to the right, and below and to the left of the particle must also be filled, so the filled part of the lattice extends infinitely downward to the left and right. The boundary between filled and unfilled positions (the thin black line in the figure) is interpreted as modeling a surface, onto which more particles may be deposited. At each time step, the surface grows by the deposition of new particles in each local minimum of the surface; that is, at each position where it is possible to add one new particle that has existing particles below it on both sides (the lighter particles in the figure).

To model this process by Rule 184, observe that the boundary between filled and unfilled lattice positions can be marked by a polygonal line, the segments of which separate adjacent lattice positions and have slopes +1 and −1. Model a segment with slope +1 by an automaton cell with state 0, and a segment with slope −1 by an automaton cell with state 1. The local minima of the surface are the points where a segment of slope −1 lies to the left of a segment of slope +1; that is, in the automaton, a position where a cell with state 1 lies to the left of a cell with state 0. Adding a particle to that position corresponds to changing the states of these two adjacent cells from 1,0 to 0,1, so advancing the polygonal line. This is exactly the behavior of Rule 184.

Related work on this model concerns deposition in which the arrival times of additional particles are random, rather than having particles arrive at all local minima simultaneously. These stochastic growth processes can be modeled as an asynchronous cellular automaton.

== Ballistic annihilation ==
Rule 184 as a model of ballistic annihilation. Particles and antiparticles (modeled by consecutive cells with the same state) move in opposite directions and annihilate each other when they collide.

Ballistic annihilation describes a process by which moving particles and antiparticles annihilate each other when they collide. In the simplest version of this process, the system consists of a single type of particle and antiparticle, moving at equal speeds in opposite directions in a one-dimensional medium.

This process can be modeled by Rule 184, as follows. The particles are modeled as points that are aligned, not with the cells of the automaton, but rather with the interstices between cells. Two consecutive cells that both have state 0 model a particle at the space between these two cells that moves rightwards one cell at each time step. Symmetrically, two consecutive cells that both have state 1 model an antiparticle that moves leftwards one cell at each time step. The remaining possibilities for two consecutive cells are that they both have differing states; this is interpreted as modeling a background material without any particles in it, through which the particles move. With this interpretation, the particles and antiparticles interact by ballistic annihilation: when a rightwards-moving particle and a leftwards-moving antiparticle meet, the result is a region of background from which both particles have vanished, without any effect on any other nearby particles.

The behavior of certain other systems, such as one-dimensional cyclic cellular automata, can also be described in terms of ballistic annihilation. There is a technical restriction on the particle positions for the ballistic annihilation view of Rule 184 that does not arise in these other systems, stemming from the alternating pattern of the background: in the particle system corresponding to a Rule 184 state, if two consecutive particles are both of the same type they must be an odd number of cells apart, while if they are of opposite types they must be an even number of cells apart. However this parity restriction does not play a role in the statistical behavior of this system.

Pivato (2007) uses a similar but more complicated particle-system view of Rule 184: he not only views alternating 0–1 regions as background, but also considers regions consisting solely of a single state to be background as well. Based on this view he describes seven different particles formed by boundaries between regions, and classifies their possible interactions. See Chopard & Droz (1998, pp. 188–190) for a more general survey of the cellular automaton models of annihilation processes.

== Context-free parsing ==
In his book A New Kind of Science, Stephen Wolfram points out that rule 184, when run on patterns with density 50%, can be interpreted as parsing the context-free language describing strings formed from nested parentheses. This interpretation is closely related to the ballistic annihilation view of rule 184: in Wolfram's interpretation, an open parenthesis corresponds to a left-moving particle while a close parenthesis corresponds to a right-moving particle.

== See also ==
- Rule 30, Rule 90, and Rule 110, other one-dimensional cellular automata with different behavior
