= A New Kind of Science =

Book by Stephen Wolfram

- Author: Stephen Wolfram
- Language: English
- Subject: Complex systems
- Genre: Non-fiction
- Publisher: Wolfram Media
- Publication date: 2002
- Publication place: United States
- Media type: Print
- Pages: 1197 (hardcover)
- ISBN: 1-57955-008-8
- OCLC: 856779719
- Website: A New Kind of Science, online

A New Kind of Science is a non-fiction book written by Stephen Wolfram, and self-published in 2002 under the imprint Wolfram Media. It explores how rules that control the interactions between cellular automata can generate surprisingly non-chaotic results.

== Contents ==
=== Computation and its implications ===
The thesis of A New Kind of Science (NKS) is twofold: that the nature of computation must be explored experimentally, and that the results of these experiments have great relevance to understanding the physical world.

=== Simple programs ===
The basic subject of Wolfram's "new kind of science" is the study of simple abstract rules—essentially, elementary computer programs. In almost any class of a computational system, one very quickly finds instances of great complexity among its simplest cases (after a time series of multiple iterative loops, applying the same simple set of rules on itself, similar to a self-reinforcing cycle using a set of rules). This seems to be true regardless of the components of the system and the details of its setup. Systems explored in the book include, among others, cellular automata in one, two, and three dimensions; mobile automata; Turing machines in 1 and 2 dimensions; several varieties of substitution and network systems; recursive functions; nested recursive functions; combinators; tag systems; register machines; and reversal-addition. For a program to qualify as simple, there are several requirements:

1. Its operation can be completely explained by a simple graphical illustration.
2. It can be completely explained in a few sentences of human language.
3. It can be implemented in a computer language using just a few lines of code.
4. The number of its possible variations is small enough so that all of them can be computed.

Generally, simple programs tend to have a very simple abstract framework. Simple cellular automata, Turing machines, and combinators are examples of such frameworks, while more complex cellular automata do not necessarily qualify as simple programs. It is also possible to invent new frameworks, particularly to capture the operation of natural systems. The remarkable feature of simple programs is that a significant proportion of them can produce great complexity. Simply enumerating all possible variations of almost any class of programs quickly leads one to examples that do unexpected and interesting things. This leads to the question: if the program is so simple, where does the complexity come from? In a sense, there is not enough room in the program's definition to directly encode all the things the program can do. Therefore, simple programs can be seen as a minimal example of emergence. A logical deduction from this phenomenon is that if the details of the program's rules have little direct relationship to its behavior, then it is very difficult to directly engineer a simple program to perform a specific behavior. An alternative approach is to try to engineer a simple overall computational framework, and then do a brute-force search through all of the possible components for the best match.

Simple programs are capable of a remarkable range of behavior. Some have been proven to be universal computers. Others exhibit properties familiar from traditional science, such as thermodynamic behavior, continuum behavior, conserved quantities, percolation, sensitive dependence on initial conditions, and others. They have been used as models of traffic, material fracture, crystal growth, biological growth, and various sociological, geological, and ecological phenomena. Another feature of simple programs is that, according to the book, making them more complicated seems to have little effect on their overall complexity. A New Kind of Science argues that this is evidence that simple programs are enough to capture the essence of almost any complex system.

=== Mapping and mining the computational universe ===
In order to study simple rules and their often-complex behavior, Wolfram argues that it is necessary to systematically explore all these computational systems and document what they do. He further argues that this study should become a new branch of science, like physics or chemistry. The basic goal of this field is to understand and characterize the computational universe using experimental methods.

The proposed new branch of scientific exploration admits many different forms of scientific production. For instance, qualitative classifications are often the results of initial forays into the computational jungle. On the other hand, explicit proofs that certain systems compute this or that function are also admissible. Some forms of production are also in some ways unique to this field of study—for example, the discovery of computational mechanisms that emerge in different systems but in bizarrely different forms.

Another type of production involves the creation of programs for the analysis of computational systems. In the NKS framework, these themselves should be simple programs, and subject to the same goals and methodology. An extension of this idea is that the human mind is itself a computational system, and hence providing it with raw data in as effective a way as possible is crucial to research. Wolfram believes that programs and their analysis should be visualized as directly as possible, and exhaustively examined by the thousands or more. Since this new field concerns abstract rules, it can in principle address issues relevant to other fields of science. But in general, Wolfram's idea is that novel ideas and mechanisms can be discovered in the computational universe, where they can be represented in their simplest forms, and then other fields can choose among these discoveries for those they find relevant.

=== Systematic abstract science ===
While Wolfram advocates simple programs as a scientific discipline, he also argues that its methodology will revolutionize other fields of science. The basis of his argument is that the study of simple programs is the minimal possible form of science, grounded equally in both abstraction and empirical experimentation. Every aspect of the methodology NKS advocates is optimized to make experimentation as direct, easy, and meaningful as possible while maximizing the chances that the experiment will do something unexpected. Just as this methodology allows computational mechanisms to be studied in their simplest forms, Wolfram argues that the process of doing so engages with the mathematical basis of the physical world, and therefore has much to offer the sciences.

Wolfram argues that the computational realities of the universe make science hard for fundamental reasons. But he also argues that by understanding the importance of these realities, we can learn to use them in our favor. For instance, instead of reverse engineering our theories from observation, we can enumerate systems and then try to match them to the behaviors we observe. A major theme of NKS is investigating the structure of the possibility space. Wolfram argues that science is far too ad hoc, in part because the models used are too complicated and unnecessarily organized around the limited primitives of traditional mathematics. Wolfram advocates using models whose variations are enumerable and whose consequences are straightforward to compute and analyze.

=== Philosophical underpinnings ===
==== Computational irreducibility ====
Wolfram argues that one of his achievements is in providing a coherent system of ideas that justifies computation as an organizing principle of science. For instance, he argues that the concept of computational irreducibility (that some complex computations are not amenable to short-cuts and cannot be "reduced"), is ultimately the reason why computational models of nature must be considered in addition to traditional mathematical models. Likewise, his idea of intrinsic randomness generation—that natural systems can generate their own randomness, rather than using chaos theory or stochastic perturbations—implies that computational models do not need to include explicit randomness.

==== Principle of computational equivalence ====
Based on his experimental results, Wolfram developed the principle of computational equivalence (PCE): the principle says that systems found in the natural world can perform computations up to a maximal ("universal") level of computational power. Most systems can attain this level. Systems, in principle, compute the same things as a computer. Computation is therefore simply a question of translating input and outputs from one system to another. Consequently, most systems are computationally equivalent. Proposed examples of such systems are the workings of the human brain and the evolution of weather systems.

The principle can be restated as follows: almost all processes that are not obviously simple are of equivalent sophistication. From this principle, Wolfram draws an array of concrete deductions that he argues reinforce his theory. Possibly the most important of these is an explanation of why we experience randomness and complexity: often, the systems we analyze are just as sophisticated as we are. Thus, complexity is not a special quality of systems, like the concept of "heat", but simply a label for all systems whose computations are sophisticated. Wolfram argues that understanding this makes possible the "normal science" of the NKS paradigm.

=== Applications and results ===
NKS contains a number of specific results and ideas, and they can be organized into several themes. One common theme of examples and applications is demonstrating how little complexity it takes to achieve interesting behavior, and how the proper methodology can discover this behavior.

First, there are several cases where NKS introduces what was, during the book's composition, the simplest known system in some class that has a particular characteristic. Some examples include the first primitive recursive function that results in complexity, the smallest universal Turing machine, and the shortest axiom for propositional calculus. In a similar vein, Wolfram also demonstrates many simple programs that exhibit phenomena like phase transitions, conserved quantities, continuum behavior, and thermodynamics that are familiar from traditional science. Simple computational models of natural systems like shell growth, fluid turbulence, and phyllotaxis are a final category of applications that fall in this theme.

Another common theme is taking facts about the computational universe as a whole and using them to reason about fields in a holistic way. For instance, Wolfram discusses how facts about the computational universe inform evolutionary theory, SETI, free will, computational complexity theory, and philosophical fields like ontology, epistemology, and even postmodernism.

Wolfram suggests that the theory of computational irreducibility may explain how free will is possible in a nominally deterministic universe. He posits that the computational process in the brain of the being with free will is so complex that it cannot be captured in a simpler computation, due to the principle of computational irreducibility. Thus, while the process is indeed deterministic, there is no better way to determine the being's will than, in essence, to run the experiment and let the being exercise it.

The book also contains a number of results—both experimental and analytic—about what a particular automaton computes, or what its characteristics are, using some methods of analysis.

The book contains a new technical result in describing the Turing completeness of the Rule 110 cellular automaton. Very small Turing machines can simulate Rule 110, which Wolfram demonstrates using a 2-state 5-symbol universal Turing machine. Wolfram conjectures that a particular 2-state 3-symbol Turing machine is universal. In 2007, as part of commemorating the book's fifth anniversary, Wolfram's company offered a $25,000 prize for proof that this Turing machine is universal. Alex Smith, a computer science student from Birmingham, UK, won the prize later that year by proving Wolfram's conjecture.

== Reception ==
Periodicals gave A New Kind of Science coverage, including articles in The New York Times, Newsweek, Wired, and The Economist. Some scientists, including Cosma Shalizi and Scott Aaronson, criticized the book and perceived a fatal flaw—that simple systems such as cellular automata are not complex enough to describe the degree of complexity in evolved systems, and observed that Wolfram ignored the research categorizing the complexity of systems. Although critics accept Wolfram's result showing universal computation, they view it as minor and dispute Wolfram's claim of a paradigm shift. Others found that the work contained valuable insights and refreshing ideas. Wolfram addressed his critics in a series of blog posts.

=== Scientific philosophy ===
A tenet of NKS is that the simpler the system, the more likely a version of it will recur in a wide variety of more complicated contexts. Therefore, NKS argues that systematically exploring the space of simple programs will lead to a base of reusable knowledge. But many scientists believe that of all possible parameters, only some actually occur in the universe. For instance, of all possible permutations of the symbols making up an equation, most will be essentially meaningless. NKS has also been criticized for asserting that the behavior of simple systems is somehow representative of all systems.

=== Methodology ===
A common criticism of NKS is that it does not follow established scientific methodology. For instance, NKS does not establish rigorous mathematical definitions, nor does it attempt to prove theorems; and most formulas and equations are written in Mathematica rather than standard notation. Along these lines, NKS has also been criticized for being heavily visual, with much information conveyed by pictures that lack formal meaning. It has also been criticized for not using modern research in the field of complexity, particularly works on complexity from a rigorous mathematical perspective. And it has been criticized for misrepresenting chaos theory.

=== Utility ===
NKS has been criticized for not providing specific results that are immediately applicable to ongoing scientific research. There has also been criticism, implicit and explicit, that the study of simple programs has little connection to the physical universe and hence is of limited value. Steven Weinberg has pointed out that no real-world system has been satisfactorily explained using Wolfram's methods. Mathematician Steven G. Krantz wrote, "Just because Wolfram can cook up a cellular automaton that seems to produce the spot pattern on a leopard, may we safely conclude that he understands the mechanism by which the spots are produced on the leopard, or why the spots are there, or what function (evolutionary or mating or camouflage or other) they perform?"

=== Principle of computational equivalence (PCE) ===
The principle of computational equivalence (PCE) has been criticized for being vague, unmathematical, and not making directly verifiable predictions. It has also been criticized for being contrary to the spirit of research in mathematical logic and computational complexity theory, which seek to make fine-grained distinctions between levels of computational sophistication, and for wrongly conflating different kinds of universality property. Moreover, critics such as Ray Kurzweil have argued that it ignores the distinction between hardware and software; while two computers may be equivalent in power, it does not follow that any two programs they might run are also equivalent. Others suggest it is little more than a rechristening of the Church–Turing thesis.

=== The fundamental theory (NKS Chapter 9) ===
Wolfram's speculations of a direction toward a fundamental theory of physics have been criticized as vague and obsolete. Scott Aaronson, Professor of Computer Science at University of Texas Austin, also claims that Wolfram's methods cannot be compatible with both special relativity and Bell's theorem violations, and hence cannot explain the observed results of Bell tests.

Edward Fredkin and Konrad Zuse pioneered the idea of a computable universe, the former by writing a line in his book on how the world might be like a cellular automaton, later further developed by Fredkin using a toy model called Salt. It has been claimed that NKS tries to take these ideas as its own, but Wolfram's model of the universe is a rewriting network, not a cellular automaton, as Wolfram himself has suggested a cellular automaton cannot account for relativistic features such as no absolute time frame. Jürgen Schmidhuber has also charged that his work on Turing machine-computable physics was stolen without attribution, namely his idea on enumerating possible Turing-computable universes.

In a 2002 review of NKS, the Nobel laureate and elementary particle physicist Steven Weinberg wrote, "Wolfram himself is a lapsed elementary particle physicist, and I suppose he can't resist trying to apply his experience with digital computer programs to the laws of nature. This has led him to the view (also considered in a 1981 paper by Richard Feynman) that nature is discrete rather than continuous. He suggests that space consists of a set of isolated points, like cells in a cellular automaton, and that even time flows in discrete steps. Following an idea of Edward Fredkin, he concludes that the universe itself would then be an automaton, like a giant computer. It's possible, but I can't see any motivation for these speculations, except that this is the sort of system that Wolfram and others have become used to in their work on computers. So might a carpenter, looking at the moon, suppose that it is made of wood."

=== Natural selection ===
Wolfram's claim that natural selection is not the fundamental cause of complexity in biology has led journalist Chris Lavers to say that Wolfram does not understand the theory of evolution.

=== Originality ===
NKS has been criticized as not original or important enough to justify its title and claims.

The authoritative manner in which NKS presents a vast number of examples and arguments has been criticized as leading the reader to believe that each of these is original to Wolfram; in particular, one of the most substantial new technical results presented in the book, that the rule 110 cellular automaton is Turing complete, was not proven by Wolfram. Wolfram credits the proof to his research assistant Matthew Cook.

== See also ==
- Digital physics
- Scientific reductionism
- Calculating Space
- Marcus Hutter's "Universal Artificial Intelligence" algorithm
