= Elementary cellular automaton =

Mathematics concept

An animation of how an evolution is determined in Rule 30, one of the 256 possible rules of elementary cellular automata

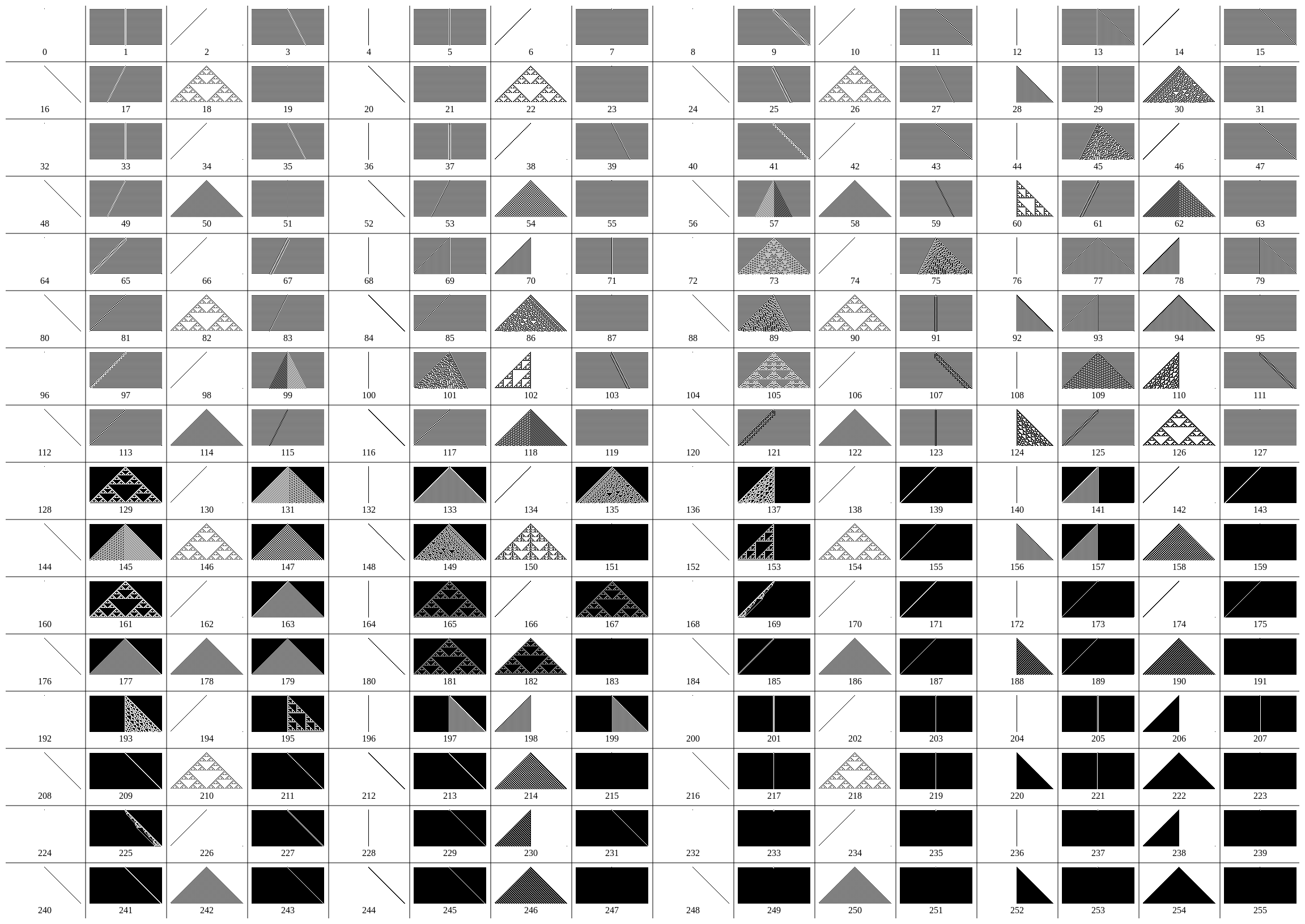
All the 256 elementary cellular automaton rules (click or tap to enlarge)

In mathematics and computability theory, an elementary cellular automaton is a one-dimensional cellular automaton where there are two possible states (labeled 0 and 1) and the rule to determine the state of a cell in the next generation depends only on the current state of the cell and its two immediate neighbors. There is an elementary cellular automaton (rule 110, defined below) which is capable of universal computation, and as such it is one of the simplest possible models of computation.

== The numbering system ==
There are 8 = 2^{3} possible configurations for a cell and its two immediate neighbors. The rule defining the cellular automaton must specify the resulting state for each of these possibilities so there are 256 = 2^{2^{3}} possible elementary cellular automata. Stephen Wolfram proposed a scheme, known as the Wolfram code, to assign each rule a number from 0 to 255 which has become standard. Each possible current configuration is written in order, 111, 110, ..., 001, 000, and the resulting state for each of these configurations is written in the same order and interpreted as the binary representation of an integer. This number is taken to be the rule number of the automaton. For example, 110_{d}=01101110_{2}. So rule 110 is defined by the transition rule:

111	110	101	100	011	010	001	000	current pattern	P=(L,C,R)
0	1	1	0	1	1	1	0	new state for center cell	N_{110_{d}}=(C+R+C*R+L*C*R)%2

== Reflections and complements ==
Although there are 256 possible rules, many of these are trivially equivalent to each other up to a simple transformation of the underlying geometry. The first such transformation is reflection through a vertical axis and the result of applying this transformation to a given rule is called the mirrored rule. These rules will exhibit the same behavior up to reflection through a vertical axis, and so are equivalent in a computational sense.

For example, if the definition of rule 110 is reflected through a vertical line, the following rule (rule 124) is obtained:

111	110	101	100	011	010	001	000	current pattern	P=(L,C,R)
0	1	1	1	1	1	0	0	new state for center cell	N_{112_{d}+12_{d}=124_{d}}=(L+C+L*C+L*C*R)%2

Rules which are the same as their mirrored rule are called amphichiral. Of the 256 elementary cellular automata, 64 are amphichiral.

The second such transformation is to exchange the roles of 0 and 1 in the definition. The result of applying this transformation to a given rule is called the complementary rule. For example, if this transformation is applied to rule 110, we get the following rule

current pattern	000	001	010	011	100	101	110	111
new state for center cell	1	0	0	1	0	0	0	1

and, after reordering, we discover that this is rule 137:

current pattern	111	110	101	100	011	010	001	000
new state for center cell	1	0	0	0	1	0	0	1

There are 16 rules which are the same as their complementary rules.

Finally, the previous two transformations can be applied successively to a rule to obtain the mirrored complementary rule. For example, the mirrored complementary rule of rule 110 is rule 193. There are 16 rules which are the same as their mirrored complementary rules.

Of the 256 elementary cellular automata, there are 88 which are inequivalent under these transformations.

It turns out that reflection and complementation are automorphisms of the monoid of one-dimensional cellular automata, as they both preserve composition.

== Single 1 histories ==
One method used to study these automata is to follow its history with an initial state of all 0s except for a single cell with a 1. When the rule number is even (so that an input of 000 does not compute to a 1) it makes sense to interpret state at each time, t, as an integer expressed in binary, producing a sequence a(t) of integers. In many cases these sequences have simple, closed form expressions or have a generating function with a simple form. The following rules are notable:

=== Rule 28 ===
The sequence generated is 1, 3, 5, 11, 21, 43, 85, 171, ... (sequence A001045 in the OEIS). This is the sequence of Jacobsthal numbers and has generating function

$$\frac{1+2x}{(1+x)(1-2x)}$$.

It has the closed form expression

$$a(t) = \frac{4\cdot 2^t-(-1)^t}{3}$$

Rule 156 generates the same sequence.

=== Rule 50 ===
The sequence generated is 1, 5, 21, 85, 341, 1365, 5461, 21845, ... (sequence A002450 in the OEIS). This has generating function

$$\frac{1}{(1-x)(1-4x)}$$.

It has the closed form expression

$$a(t) = \frac{4\cdot 4^t-1}{3}$$.

Note that rules 58, 114, 122, 178, 186, 242 and 250 generate the same sequence.

=== Rule 54 ===
The sequence generated is 1, 7, 17, 119, 273, 1911, 4369, 30583, ... (sequence A118108 in the OEIS). This has generating function

$$\frac{1+7x}{(1-x^2)(1-16x^2)}$$.

It has the closed form expression

$$a(t) = \frac{22\cdot 4^t-6(-4)^t-4+3(-1)^t}{15}$$.

=== Rule 60 ===
The sequence generated is 1, 3, 5, 15, 17, 51, 85, 255, ...(sequence A001317 in the OEIS). This can be obtained by taking successive rows of Pascal's triangle modulo 2 and interpreting them as integers in binary, which can be graphically represented by a Sierpinski triangle.

=== Rule 90 ===
The sequence generated is 1, 5, 17, 85, 257, 1285, 4369, 21845, ... (sequence A038183 in the OEIS). This can be obtained by taking successive rows of Pascal's triangle modulo 2 and interpreting them as integers in base 4. Note that rules 18, 26, 82, 146, 154, 210 and 218 generate the same sequence.

=== Rule 94 ===
The sequence generated is 1, 7, 27, 119, 427, 1879, 6827, 30039, ... (sequence A118101 in the OEIS). This can be expressed as

$$a(t)  =
\begin{cases}
1, & \mbox{if }t = 0 \\[5px]
7, & \mbox{if }t = 1 \\[7px]
\dfrac{1+5\cdot 4^n}{3}  , & \mbox{if }t\mbox{ is even otherwise} \\[7px]
\dfrac{10+11\cdot 4^n}{6} , & \mbox{if }t\mbox{ is odd otherwise}
\end{cases}$$.

This has generating function

$$\frac{(1+2x)(1+5x-16x^4)}{(1-x^2)(1-16x^2)}$$.

=== Rule 102 ===
The sequence generated is 1, 6, 20, 120, 272, 1632, 5440, 32640, ... (sequence A117998 in the OEIS). This is simply the sequence generated by rule 60 (which is its mirror rule) multiplied by successive powers of 2.

=== Rule 110 ===
The sequence generated is 1, 6, 28, 104, 496, 1568, 7360, 27520, 130304, 396800, ... (sequence A117999 in the OEIS). Rule 110 has the perhaps surprising property that it is Turing complete, and thus capable of universal computation.

=== Rule 150 ===
The sequence generated is 1, 7, 21, 107, 273, 1911, 5189, 28123, ... (sequence A038184 in the OEIS). This can be obtained by taking the coefficients of the successive powers of (1+x+x^{2}) modulo 2 and interpreting them as integers in binary.

=== Rule 158 ===
The sequence generated is 1, 7, 29, 115, 477, 1843, 7645, 29491, ... (sequence A118171 in the OEIS). This has generating function

$$\frac{1+7x+12x^2-4x^3}{(1-x^2)(1-16x^2)}$$.

=== Rule 188 ===
The sequence generated is 1, 3, 5, 15, 29, 55, 93, 247, ... (sequence A118173 in the OEIS). This has generating function

$$\frac{1+3x+4x^2+12x^3+8x^4-8x^5}{(1-x^2)(1-16x^4)}$$.

=== Rule 190 ===
The sequence generated is 1, 7, 29, 119, 477, 1911, 7645, 30583, ... (sequence A037576 in the OEIS). This has generating function

$$\frac{1+3x}{(1-x^2)(1-4x)}$$.

=== Rule 220 ===
The sequence generated is 1, 3, 7, 15, 31, 63, 127, 255, ... (sequence A000225 in the OEIS). This is the sequence of Mersenne numbers and has generating function

$$\frac{1}{(1-x)(1-2x)}$$.

It has the closed form expression

$$a(t) = 2\cdot 2^t-1$$.

Note: rule 252 generates the same sequence.

=== Rule 222 ===
The sequence generated is 1, 7, 31, 127, 511, 2047, 8191, 32767, ... (sequence A083420 in the OEIS). This is every other entry in the sequence of Mersenne numbers and has generating function

$$\frac{1+2x}{(1-x)(1-4x)}$$.

It has the closed form expression

$$a(t) = 2\cdot 4^t-1$$.

Note that rule 254 generates the same sequence.

== Images for rules ==
These images depict space-time diagrams, in which each row of pixels shows the cells of the automaton at a single point in time, with time increasing downwards. They start with an initial automaton state in which a single cell, the pixel in the center of the top row of pixels, is in state 1 and all other cells are 0. Each image depicts first 40 generations and clicking on it shows first 1000.

Rule 0	Rule 1	Rule 2	Rule 3	Rule 4	Rule 5
Rule 6	Rule 7	Rule 8	Rule 9	Rule 10	Rule 11
Rule 12	Rule 13	Rule 14	Rule 15	Rule 16	Rule 17
Rule 18	Rule 19	Rule 20	Rule 21	Rule 22	Rule 23
Rule 24	Rule 25	Rule 26	Rule 27	Rule 28	Rule 29
Rule 30	Rule 31	Rule 32	Rule 33	Rule 34	Rule 35
Rule 36	Rule 37	Rule 38	Rule 39	Rule 40	Rule 41
Rule 42	Rule 43	Rule 44	Rule 45	Rule 46	Rule 47
Rule 48	Rule 49	Rule 50	Rule 51	Rule 52	Rule 53
Rule 54	Rule 55	Rule 56	Rule 57	Rule 58	Rule 59
Rule 60	Rule 61	Rule 62	Rule 63	Rule 64	Rule 65
Rule 66	Rule 67	Rule 68	Rule 69	Rule 70	Rule 71
Rule 72	Rule 73	Rule 74	Rule 75	Rule 76	Rule 77
Rule 78	Rule 79	Rule 80	Rule 81	Rule 82	Rule 83
Rule 84	Rule 85	Rule 86	Rule 87	Rule 88	Rule 89
Rule 90	Rule 91	Rule 92	Rule 93	Rule 94	Rule 95
Rule 96	Rule 97	Rule 98	Rule 99	Rule 100	Rule 101
Rule 102	Rule 103	Rule 104	Rule 105	Rule 106	Rule 107
Rule 108	Rule 109	Rule 110	Rule 111	Rule 112	Rule 113
Rule 114	Rule 115	Rule 116	Rule 117	Rule 118	Rule 119
Rule 120	Rule 121	Rule 122	Rule 123	Rule 124	Rule 125
Rule 126	Rule 127	Rule 128	Rule 129	Rule 130	Rule 131
Rule 132	Rule 133	Rule 134	Rule 135	Rule 136	Rule 137
Rule 138	Rule 139	Rule 140	Rule 141	Rule 142	Rule 143
Rule 144	Rule 145	Rule 146	Rule 147	Rule 148	Rule 149
Rule 150	Rule 151	Rule 152	Rule 153	Rule 154	Rule 155
Rule 156	Rule 157	Rule 158	Rule 159	Rule 160	Rule 161
Rule 162	Rule 163	Rule 164	Rule 165	Rule 166	Rule 167
Rule 168	Rule 169	Rule 170	Rule 171	Rule 172	Rule 173
Rule 174	Rule 175	Rule 176	Rule 177	Rule 178	Rule 179
Rule 180	Rule 181	Rule 182	Rule 183	Rule 184	Rule 185
Rule 186	Rule 187	Rule 188	Rule 189	Rule 190	Rule 191
Rule 192	Rule 193	Rule 194	Rule 195	Rule 196	Rule 197
Rule 198	Rule 199	Rule 200	Rule 201	Rule 202	Rule 203
Rule 204	Rule 205	Rule 206	Rule 207	Rule 208	Rule 209
Rule 210	Rule 211	Rule 212	Rule 213	Rule 214	Rule 215
Rule 216	Rule 217	Rule 218	Rule 219	Rule 220	Rule 221
Rule 222	Rule 223	Rule 224	Rule 225	Rule 226	Rule 227
Rule 228	Rule 229	Rule 230	Rule 231	Rule 232	Rule 233
Rule 234	Rule 235	Rule 236	Rule 237	Rule 238	Rule 239
Rule 240	Rule 241	Rule 242	Rule 243	Rule 244	Rule 245
Rule 246	Rule 247	Rule 248	Rule 249	Rule 250	Rule 251
Rule 252	Rule 253	Rule 254	Rule 255		

== Random initial state ==
A second way to investigate the behavior of these automata is to examine its history starting with a random state. This behavior can be better understood in terms of Wolfram classes. Wolfram gives the following examples as typical rules of each class.

- Class 1: Cellular automata which rapidly converge to a uniform state. Examples are rules 0, 32, 160 and 232.
- Class 2: Cellular automata which rapidly converge to a repetitive or stable state. Examples are rules 4, 108, 218 and 250.
- Class 3: Cellular automata which appear to remain in a random state. Examples are rules 22, 30, 126, 150, 182.
- Class 4: Cellular automata which form areas of repetitive or stable states, but also form structures that interact with each other in complicated ways. An example is rule 110. Rule 110 has been shown to be capable of universal computation.

Each computed result is placed under that result's source creating a two-dimensional representation of the system's evolution.

In the following gallery, this evolution from random initial conditions is shown for each of the 88 inequivalent rules. Below each image is the rule number used to produce the image, and in brackets the rule numbers of equivalent rules produced by reflection or complementing are included, if they exist. As mentioned above, the reflected rule would produce a reflected image, while the complementary rule would produce an image with black and white swapped.

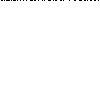
Rule 0 (255)

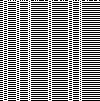
Rule 1 (127)

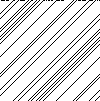
Rule 2 (16, 191, 247)

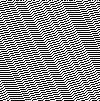
Rule 3 (17, 63, 119)

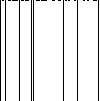
Rule 4 (223)

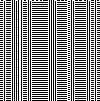
Rule 5 (95)

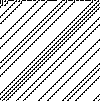
Rule 6 (20, 159, 215)

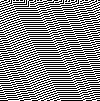
Rule 7 (21, 31, 87)

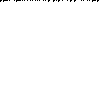
Rule 8 (64, 239, 253)

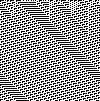
Rule 9 (65, 111, 125)

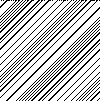
Rule 10 (80, 175, 245)

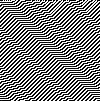
Rule 11 (47, 81, 117)

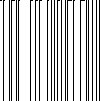
Rule 12 (68, 207, 221)

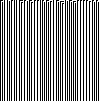
Rule 13 (69, 79, 93)

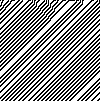
Rule 14 (84, 143, 213)

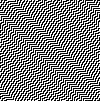
Rule 15 (85)

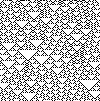
Rule 18 (183)

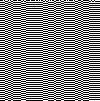
Rule 19 (55)

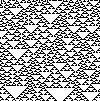
Rule 22 (151)

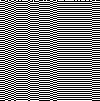
Rule 23

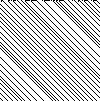
Rule 24 (66, 189, 231)

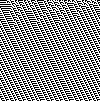
Rule 25 (61, 67, 103)

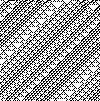
Rule 26 (82, 167, 181)

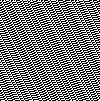
Rule 27 (39, 53, 83)

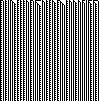
Rule 28 (70, 157, 199)

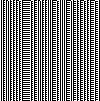
Rule 29 (71)

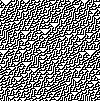
Rule 30 (86, 135, 149)

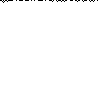
Rule 32 (251)

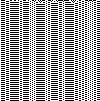
Rule 33 (123)

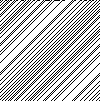
Rule 34 (48, 187, 243)

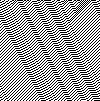
Rule 35 (49, 59, 115)

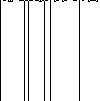
Rule 36 (219)

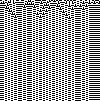
Rule 37 (91)

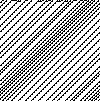
Rule 38 (52, 155, 211)

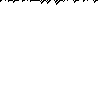
Rule 40 (96, 235, 249)

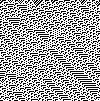
Rule 41 (97, 107, 121)

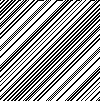
Rule 42 (112, 171, 241)

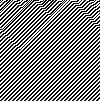
Rule 43 (113)

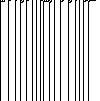
Rule 44 (100, 203, 217)

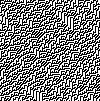
Rule 45 (75, 89, 101)

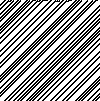
Rule 46 (116, 139, 209)

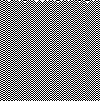
Rule 50 (179)

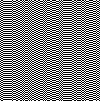
Rule 51

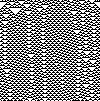
Rule 54 (147)

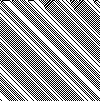
Rule 56 (98, 185, 227)

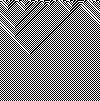
Rule 57 (99)

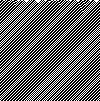
Rule 58 (114, 163, 177)

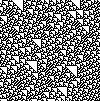
Rule 60 (102, 153, 195)

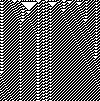
Rule 62 (118, 131, 145)

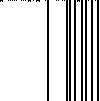
Rule 72 (237)

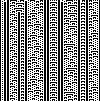
Rule 73 (109)

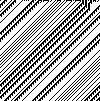
Rule 74 (88, 173, 229)

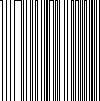
Rule 76 (205)

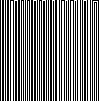
Rule 77

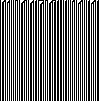
Rule 78 (92, 141, 197)

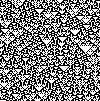
Rule 90 (165)

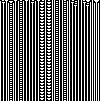
Rule 94 (133)

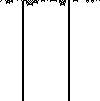
Rule 104 (233)

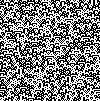
Rule 105

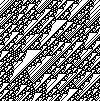
Rule 106 (120, 169, 225)

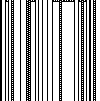
Rule 108 (201)

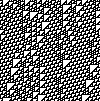
Rule 110 (124, 137, 193)

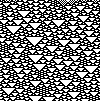
Rule 122 (161)

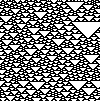
Rule 126 (129)

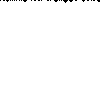
Rule 128 (254)

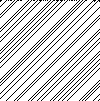
Rule 130 (144, 190, 246)

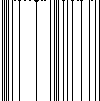
Rule 132 (222)

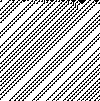
Rule 134 (148, 158, 214)

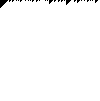
Rule 136 (192, 238, 252)

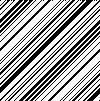
Rule 138 (174, 208, 244)

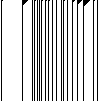
Rule 140 (196, 206, 220)

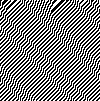
Rule 142 (212)

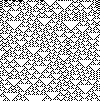
Rule 146 (182)

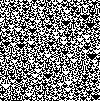
Rule 150

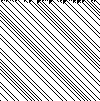
Rule 152 (188, 194, 230)

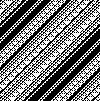
Rule 154 (166, 180, 210)

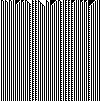
Rule 156 (198)

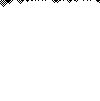
Rule 160 (250)

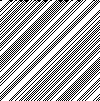
Rule 162 (176, 186, 242)

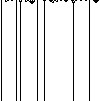
Rule 164 (218)

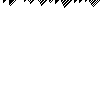
Rule 168 (224, 234, 248)

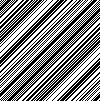
Rule 170 (240)

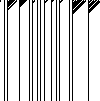
Rule 172 (202, 216, 228)

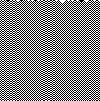
Rule 178

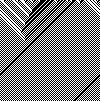
Rule 184 (226)

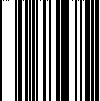
Rule 200 (236)

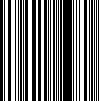
Rule 204

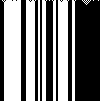
Rule 232

=== Unusual cases ===
In some cases the behavior of a cellular automaton is not immediately obvious. For example, for Rule 62, interacting structures develop as in a Class 4. But in these interactions at least one of the structures is annihilated so the automaton eventually enters a repetitive state and the cellular automaton is Class 2.

Rule 73 is Class 2 because any time there are two consecutive 1s surrounded by 0s, this feature is preserved in succeeding generations. This effectively creates walls which block the flow of information between different parts of the array. There are a finite number of possible configurations in the section between two walls so the automaton must eventually start repeating inside each section, though the period may be very long if the section is wide enough. These walls will form with probability 1 for completely random initial conditions. However, if the condition is added that the lengths of runs of consecutive 0s or 1s must always be odd, then the automaton displays Class 3 behavior since the walls can never form.

Rule 54 is Class 4 and also appears to be capable of universal computation, but has not been studied as thoroughly as Rule 110. Many interacting structures have been cataloged which collectively are expected to be sufficient for universality.

== Deterministic solvability ==
Many elementary cellular automata are deterministically solvable, meaning that one can express the state of a given cell after $n$ iterations starting from initial configuration $x \in \{0,1\} ^{\Z}$ by an explicit formula.

Let $[F^n(x)]_j$ represent the state of cell $j$ after $n$ iterations or rule $F$. Initial condition is represented by $x$, so that $x_i$ is the state of cell $i$ in the initial configuration, $x_i \in \{0,1\}$. Three representative examples are shown below.

Rule 90:

$$[F^n(x)]_j= \sum _{i=0}^{n}\binom{n}{i}x_{{2\,i-n+j}} \mod 2$$

Rule 50:

$$[F^n(x)]_j = \frac{1}{2}+ \frac{1}{2} \left( -1 \right) ^{n}
+\sum _{i=1}^{n-1} \left(  \left( -1 \right) ^{i+n} \prod _{p=-i}^{i}x_{{p+j}} \right)
+\sum _{i=0}^{n} \left(  \left( -1 \right) ^{i+n+1}  \prod _{p=-i}^{i} \overline{x}_{p+j}  \right)$$

Rule 172:

$$[F^n(x)]_j =  \bar{x}_{{j-2}} \bar{x}_{{j-1}}  x_{{j}}+
\left(  \bar{x}_{{j+n-2}}  x_{{j+n-1}}+x_{{j+n-2}}x_{{j+n}}
\right) \prod _{i=j-2}^{j+n-3}(1- \bar{x}_{{i}}  \bar{x}_{{i+1}} )$$

In the above, $\bar{x}_j=1-x_j$.

Deterministic solution formulae have been derived by H. Fukś for the following minimal elementary rules: 0, 1, 2, 3, 4, 5, 8, 10, 11, 12, 13, 14, 15, 19, 23, 24, 27, 28, 29, 32, 34, 36, 38, 40, 42, 43, 44, 46, 50, 51, 56, 60, 72, 76, 77, 78, 90, 105, 108, 128, 130, 132, 136, 138, 140, 142, 150, 156, 160, 162, 164, 168, 170, 172, 178, 184, 200, 204, and 232. Using these formulae, it is possible to derive probabilities occurrence of small blocks of symbols. Entries for Rule 184 or Rule 90 show examples of expressions for such probabilities.
