= Gould's sequence =

Integer sequence

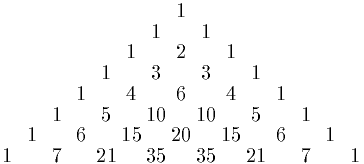
Pascal's triangle, rows 0 through 7. The number of odd integers in row i is the i-th number in Gould's sequence.

The self-similar sawtooth shape of Gould's sequence

Gould's sequence is an integer sequence named after Henry W. Gould that counts how many odd numbers are in each row of Pascal's triangle. It consists only of powers of two, and begins:

1, 2, 2, 4, 2, 4, 4, 8, 2, 4, 4, 8, 4, 8, 8, 16, 2, 4, ... (sequence A001316 in the OEIS)

For instance, the sixth number in the sequence is 4, because there are four odd numbers in the sixth row of Pascal's triangle (the four bold numbers in the sequence 1, 5, 10, 10, 5, 1). Gould's sequence is also a fractal sequence.

== Additional interpretations ==
The nth value in the sequence (starting from n = 0) gives the highest power of 2 that divides the central binomial coefficient $\tbinom{2n}{n}$, and it gives the numerator of $2^n/n!$ (expressed as a fraction in lowest terms).

Sierpinski triangle generated by Rule 90, or by marking the positions of odd numbers in Pascal's triangle. Gould's sequence counts the number of live cells in each row of this pattern.

Gould's sequence also gives the number of live cells in the nth generation of the Rule 90 cellular automaton starting from a single live cell. It has a characteristic growing sawtooth shape that can be used to recognize physical processes that behave similarly to Rule 90.

== Related sequences ==
The binary logarithms (exponents in the powers of two) of Gould's sequence themselves form an integer sequence,

0, 1, 1, 2, 1, 2, 2, 3, 1, 2, 2, 3, 2, 3, 3, 4, ... (sequence A000120 in the OEIS)

in which the nth value gives the number of nonzero bits in the binary representation of the number n, sometimes written in mathematical notation as $\#_1(n)$. Equivalently, the nth value in Gould's sequence is

$$2^{\#_1(n)}.$$

Taking the sequence of exponents modulo two gives the Thue–Morse sequence.

The partial sums of Gould's sequence,

0, 1, 3, 5, 9, 11, 15, 19, 27, 29, 33, 37, 45, ... (sequence A006046 in the OEIS)

count all odd numbers in the first n rows of Pascal's triangle. These numbers grow proportionally to $n^{\log_2 3}\approx n^{1.585}$, but with a constant of proportionality that oscillates between 0.812556... and 1, periodically as a function of log n.

== Recursive construction and self-similarity ==
The first 2^{i} values in Gould's sequence may be constructed by recursively constructing the first 2^{i − 1} values, and then concatenating the doubles of the first 2^{i − 1} values. For instance, concatenating the first four values 1, 2, 2, 4 with their doubles 2, 4, 4, 8 produces the first eight values. Because of this doubling construction, the first occurrence of each power of two 2^{i} in this sequence is at position 2^{i} − 1.

Gould's sequence, the sequence of its exponents, and the Thue–Morse sequence are all self-similar: they have the property that the subsequence of values at even positions in the whole sequence equals the original sequence, a property they also share with some other sequences such as Stern's diatomic sequence. In Gould's sequence, the values at odd positions are double their predecessors, while in the sequence of exponents, the values at odd positions are one plus their predecessors.

== History ==
The sequence is named after Henry W. Gould, who studied it in the early 1960s. However, the fact that these numbers are powers of two, with the exponent of the nth number equal to the number of ones in the binary representation of n, was already known to J. W. L. Glaisher in 1899.

Proving that the numbers in Gould's sequence are powers of two was given as a problem in the 1956 William Lowell Putnam Mathematical Competition.
