= Complex Systems (journal) =

Scientific journal

- Discipline: Complex systems
- Language: English
- Edited by: Hector Zenil

Publication details
- History: 1987–present
- Publisher: Complex Systems Publication
- Frequency: Quarterly
- Open access: Yes

Standard abbreviations
- ISO 4: Complex Syst.
- MathSciNet: Complex Systems

Indexing
- ISSN: 0891-2513
- LCCN: 87640329
- OCLC no.: 613305429

Links
- Journal homepage; Online access; Online archives

Complex Systems is a quarterly peer-reviewed open access scientific journal covering subjects ranging across a number of scientific and engineering fields, including computational biology, computer science, mathematics, and physics. It was established in 1987 with Stephen Wolfram as founding editor-in-chief. The journal is published by Complex Systems Publications.

== Abstracting and indexing ==
The journal is abstracted and indexed in:

- Computer and Control Abstracts
- Electrical & Electronics Abstracts
- Emerging Sources Citation Index
- Inspec
- Mathematical Reviews
- MathSciNet
- Scopus
- zbMATH Open

== See also ==
- List of systems science journals
