= Double recursion =

In recursive function theory, double recursion is an extension of primitive recursion which allows the definition of non-primitive recursive functions like the Ackermann function.

Raphael M. Robinson called functions of two natural number variables G(n, x) double recursive with respect to given functions, if

- G(0, x) is a given function of x.
- G(n + 1, 0) is obtained by substitution from the function G(n, ·) and given functions.
- G(n + 1, x + 1) is obtained by substitution from G(n + 1, x), the function G(n, ·) and given functions.

Robinson goes on to provide a specific double recursive function (originally defined by Rózsa Péter)

- G(0, x) = x + 1
- G(n + 1, 0) = G(n, 1)
- G(n + 1, x + 1) = G(n, G(n + 1, x))

where the given functions are primitive recursive, but G is not primitive recursive. In fact, this is precisely the function now known as the Ackermann function.

== See also ==
- Primitive recursion
- Ackermann function
