= Axiom of adjunction =

Principle in set theory

In mathematical set theory, the axiom of adjunction states that for any two sets x, y there is a set w = x ∪ {y} given by "adjoining" the set y to the set x. It is stated as

$$\forall x. \forall y. \exists w. \forall z. \big( z \in w \leftrightarrow (z \in x \lor z=y) \big).$$

Bernays (1937, page 68, axiom II (2)) introduced the axiom of adjunction as one of the axioms for a system of set theory that he introduced in about 1929. It is a weak axiom, used in some weak systems of set theory such as general set theory or finitary set theory. The adjunction operation is also used as one of the operations of primitive recursive set functions.

== Interpretability of arithmetic ==
Tarski and Szmielew showed that Robinson arithmetic (${\mathsf{Q}}$) can be interpreted in a weak set theory whose axioms are extensionality, the existence of the empty set, and the axiom of adjunction (Tarski 1953, p.34). In fact, in the language of set theory extended with a function symbol for adjunction, the axioms of empty set and adjunction alone (without extensionality) suffice to interpret ${\mathsf{Q}}$. (They are mutually interpretable.)

Adding epsilon-induction to empty set and adjunction yields a theory that is mutually interpretable with Peano arithmetic (${\mathsf{PA}}$). Another axiom schema also yields a theory that is mutually interpretable with ${\mathsf{PA}}$:

$$\forall x. \forall y. \exists w. \forall z. \Big(z \in w \leftrightarrow \big((z \in x \lor z = y) \land \phi\big)\Big)$$,

where $\phi$ is not allowed to have $w$ free. This combines axioms of set theory: For $\phi$ trivially true it reduced to the adjunction axiom above, and for $(z\neq y)\land P$ it gives the axiom of separation with $P$.
