= Primitive recursive set function =

In mathematics, primitive recursive set functions or primitive recursive ordinal functions are analogs of primitive recursive functions, defined for sets or ordinals rather than natural numbers. They were introduced by Jensen & Karp (1971).

== Definition ==
A primitive recursive set function is a function from sets to sets that can be obtained from the following basic functions by repeatedly applying the following rules of substitution and recursion:

The basic functions are:

- Projection: P_{n,m}(x_{1}, ..., x_{n}) = x_{m} for 0 ≤ m ≤ n
- Zero: F(x) = 0
- Adjoining an element to a set: F(x, y) = x ∪ {y}
- Testing membership: C(x, y, u, v) = x if u ∈ v, and C(x, y, u, v) = y otherwise.

The rules for generating new functions by substitution are

- F(x, y) = G(x, H(x), y)
- F(x, y) = G(H(x), y)

where x and y are finite sequences of variables.

The rule for generating new functions by recursion is

- F(z, x) = G(∪_{u ∈ z} F(u, x), z, x)

A primitive recursive ordinal function is defined in the same way, except that the initial function F(x, y) = x ∪ {y} is replaced by F(x) = x ∪ {x} (the successor of x). The primitive recursive ordinal functions are the same as the primitive recursive set functions that map ordinals to ordinals.

Examples of primitive recursive set functions:

- TC, the function assigning to a set its transitive closure.
- Given hereditarily finite $c$, the constant function $f(x)=c$.

== Extensions ==
One can also add more initial functions to obtain a larger class of functions. For example, the ordinal function $\alpha\mapsto\omega^\alpha$ is not primitive recursive, because the constant function with value ω (or any other infinite set) is not primitive recursive, so one might want to add this constant function to the initial functions.

The notion of a set function being primitive recursive in ω has the same definition as that of primitive recursion, except with ω as a parameter kept fixed, not altered by the primitive recursion schemata.

Examples of functions primitive recursive in ω: ^{pp.28--29}

- $\mathbb P_\omega(x)=\bigcup_{n<\omega}x^n$.
- The function assigning to $\alpha$ the $\alpha$th level $L_\alpha$ of Godel's constructible hierarchy.

== Primitive recursive closure ==
Let $f_0:\textrm{Ord}^2\to\textrm{Ord}$ be the function $f(\alpha,\beta) =\alpha+\beta$, and for all $i<\omega$, $\tilde{f}_i(\alpha) = f_i(\alpha,\alpha)$ and $f_{i+1}(\alpha,\beta) = (\tilde{f}_i)^\beta(\alpha)$. Let L_{α} denote the αth stage of Godel's constructible universe. L_{α} is closed under primitive recursive set functions iff α is closed under each $f_i$ for all $i<\omega$.
