= Patrick C. Fischer =

American computer scientist (1935–2011)

- Born: Patrick Carl Fischer; December 3, 1935; St. Louis, Missouri, U.S.
- Died: August 26, 2011 (aged 75); Rockville, Maryland, U.S.
- Education: University of Michigan (BA, MBA); Massachusetts Institute of Technology (PhD)
- Occupation: Computer scientist
- Employer: Vanderbilt University
- Parent: Carl H. Fischer

Patrick Carl Fischer (December 3, 1935 – August 26, 2011) was an American computer scientist, a noted researcher in computational complexity theory and database theory, and a target of the Unabomber.

== Biography ==
Fischer was born December 3, 1935, in St. Louis, Missouri. His father, Carl H. Fischer, became a professor of actuarial mathematics at the University of Michigan in 1941, and the family moved to Ann Arbor, Michigan, where he grew up. Fischer himself went to the University of Michigan, receiving a bachelor's degree in 1957 and an MBA in 1958. He went on to graduate studies at the Massachusetts Institute of Technology, earning a Ph.D. in 1962 under the supervision of Hartley Rogers, Jr., with a thesis on the subject of recursion theory.

After receiving his Ph.D. in 1962, Fischer joined the faculty of Harvard University as an assistant professor of applied mathematics; his students at Harvard included Albert R. Meyer, through whom Fischer has over 250 academic descendants. as well as noted computer scientists Dennis Ritchie and Arnold L. Rosenberg. In 1965, he moved to a tenured position as associate professor of computer science at Cornell University. After teaching at the University of British Columbia from 1967 to 1968 (where he met his second wife Charlotte Froese) he moved to the University of Waterloo where he became a professor of applied analysis and computer science. At Waterloo, he was department chair from 1972 to 1974. He then moved to Pennsylvania State University in 1974, where he headed the computer science department, and moved again to Vanderbilt University as department chair in 1980. He taught at Vanderbilt for 18 years, and was chair for 15 years. He retired in 1998, and died of stomach cancer on August 26, 2011, in Rockville, Maryland.

Like his father, Fischer became a fellow of the Society of Actuaries. Fischer's second wife, Charlotte Froese Fischer, was also a computer science professor at Vanderbilt University and the University of British Columbia, and his brother, Michael J. Fischer, is a computer science professor at Yale University.

== Research ==
Fischer's thesis research concerned the effects of different models of computation on the efficiency of solving problems. For instance, he showed how to generate the sequence of prime numbers using a one-dimensional cellular automaton, based on earlier solutions to the firing squad synchronization problem, and his work in this area set the foundation for much later work on parallel algorithms. With Meyer and Rosenberg, Fischer performed influential early research on counter machines, showing that they obeyed time hierarchy and space hierarchy theorems analogous to those for Turing machines.

Fischer was an early leader in the field of computational complexity, and helped establish theoretical computer science as a discipline separate from mathematics and electrical engineering. He was the first chair of SIGACT, the Special Interest Group on Algorithms and Computation Theory of the Association for Computing Machinery, which he founded in 1968. He also founded the annual Symposium on Theory of Computing, which together with the Symposium on Foundations of Computer Science is one of the two flagship conferences in theoretical computer science, and he served five times as chair of the conference.

In the 1980s, Fischer's research interests shifted to database theory. His research in that area included the study of the semantics of databases, metadata, and incomplete information. Fischer did important work defining the nested relational model of databases, in which the values in the cells of a relational database may themselves be relations, and his work on the mathematical foundations of database query languages became central to the databases now used by major web servers worldwide.

Fischer was also an expert in information systems and their use by educational institutions.

== Unabomber target ==
Ted Kaczynski, known as the Unabomber, was a graduate student of mathematics at the University of Michigan, where Fischer's father was a professor. In 1982, Kaczynski sent the fifth of his mail bombs to Fischer, at his Penn State address; it was forwarded to Vanderbilt, where it was opened on May 5 by Fischer's secretary, Janet Smith, who was hospitalized for three weeks after the attack. Fischer claimed not to have ever met Kaczynski, and speculated that he was targeted because he "went from pure math to theoretical computer science."
