= Wang B-machine =

As presented by Hao Wang (1954, 1957), his basic machine B is an extremely simple computational model equivalent to the Turing machine. It is "the first formulation of a Turing-machine theory in terms of computer-like models" (Minsky, 1967: 200). With only 4 sequential instructions it is very similar to, but even simpler than, the 7 sequential instructions of the Post–Turing machine. In the same paper, Wang introduced a variety of equivalent machines, including what he called the W-machine, which is the B-machine with an "erase" instruction added to the instruction set.

== Description ==
As defined by Wang (1954) the B-machine has at its command only 4 instructions:

1. → : Move tape-scanning head one tape square to the right (or move tape one square left), then continue to next instruction in numerical sequence;
2. ← : Move tape-scanning head one tape square to the left (or move tape one square right), then continue to next instruction in numerical sequence;
3. * : In scanned tape-square print mark * then go to next instruction in numerical sequence;
4. Cn: Conditional "transfer" (jump, branch) to instruction "n": If scanned tape-square is marked then go to instruction "n" else (if scanned square is blank) continue to next instruction in numerical sequence.

A sample of a simple B-machine instruction is his example:

1. *, 2. →, 3. C2, 4. →, 5. ←

He rewrites this as a collection of ordered pairs:

{ ( 1, * ), ( 2, → ), ( 3, C2 ), ( 4, → ), ( 5, ← ) }

Wang's W-machine is simply the B-machine with the one additional instruction

5. E : In scanned tape-square erase the mark * (if there is one) then go to next instruction in numerical sequence.

== See also ==
- Codd's cellular automaton
- Counter-machine model
