= Arnold L. Rosenberg =

American computer scientist

Arnold Leonard Rosenberg (born February 11, 1941) is an American computer scientist. He is a distinguished university professor emeritus at the University of Massachusetts Amherst, and despite his retirement from UMass he continues to hold research positions at Northeastern University and Colorado State University.

Rosenberg is known, among other contributions, for formulating the Aanderaa–Karp–Rosenberg conjecture stating that many nontrivial properties in graph theory cannot be answered without testing for the presence or absence of every possible edge in a given graph.

Rosenberg did both his undergraduate and graduate studies at Harvard University, receiving a bachelor's degree in 1962 and a Ph.D. in 1966 under the supervision of Patrick C. Fischer. Prior to joining the UMass faculty, Rosenberg worked at the Thomas J. Watson Research Center from 1965 until 1981, and was a faculty member at Duke University from 1981 until 1985. He was elected a fellow of the Association for Computing Machinery in 1996 for his work on "graph-theoretic models of computation, emphasizing theoretical studies of parallel algorithms and architectures, VLSI design and layout, and data structures". In 1997, he was elected as a fellow of the IEEE "for fundamental contributions to theoretical aspects of computer science and engineering".
