= Peter van Emde Boas =

Dutch computer scientist

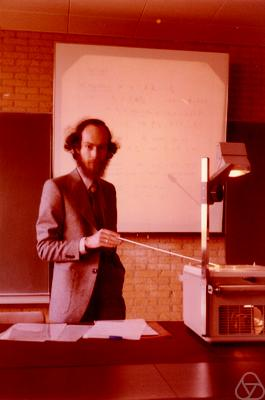
- Van Emde Boas in 1977
- Born: April 3, 1945 (age 79); Amsterdam, Netherlands
- Known for: Van Emde Boas tree
- Scientific career
- Doctoral advisor: Adriaan van Wijngaarden

Peter van Emde Boas (Dutch pronunciation: [ˈpeːtər vɑn ˈɛmdə ˈboːɑs]; born 3 April 1945) is a Dutch computer scientist and professor at the University of Amsterdam. He gained his doctorate in 1974 under Adriaan van Wijngaarden. The Van Emde Boas tree is named after him.
