= Enumerator =

Enumerator may refer to:

- Iterator (computer science)
- An enumerator in the context of iteratees
- in computer programming, a value of an enumerated type
- Enumerator (computer science), a Turing machine that lists elements of some set S.
- a census taker, a person performing door-to-door around census, to count the people and gather demographic data.
- a person employed in the counting of votes in an election.
- Enumerator polynomial
