= Genetix =

Virtual machine

Genetix is a virtual machine created by theoretical physicist Bernard Hodson containing only 34 executable instructions. It was inspired by the principles of Alan Turing and allows for an entire operating system, including a word processor and utilities, to run on 32 kilobytes.

"Genes" are sequences of 50 to 100 pointers that either point directly to one of the 34 basic instructions or to another gene. The 700 genes take up approximately 26 kilobytes in size all together. The "gene pool" consists of a closed section and an open section where the users can add their own made genes.

Upsides are security and efficiency.

Hodson suggested that a simple compiler could process any application and that the rules were so simple that an application could be developed without the need for a compiler at all. He also suggested that embedded systems might be a good market for Genetix.

== See also ==
- Turing machine
- von Neumann machine (disambiguation)
