= AFLM =

AFLM may refer to:

- AFLM, a type of Pointer machine in theoretical computer science
- AflM, involved in the production of Aflatoxin B_{1}
- Australian Football League, an Australian football league sometimes referred to as AFLM (AFL men's), especially when in relation to AFL Women's
