= Algorithmic technique =

In mathematics and computer science, an algorithmic technique is a general approach for implementing a process or computation.

== General techniques ==
There are several broadly recognized algorithmic techniques that offer a proven method or process for designing and constructing algorithms. Different techniques may be used depending on the objective, which may include searching, sorting, mathematical optimization, constraint satisfaction, categorization, analysis, and prediction.

=== Brute force ===
Brute force is a simple, exhaustive technique that evaluates every possible outcome to find a solution.

=== Divide and conquer ===
The divide and conquer technique decomposes complex problems recursively into smaller sub-problems. Each sub-problem is then solved and these partial solutions are recombined to determine the overall solution. This technique is often used for searching and sorting.

=== Dynamic programming ===
Dynamic programming is a systematic technique in which a complex problem is decomposed recursively into smaller, overlapping subproblems for solution. Dynamic programming stores the results of the overlapping sub-problems locally using an optimization technique called memoization.

=== Evolutionary ===
An evolutionary approach develops candidate solutions and then, in a manner similar to biological evolution, performs a series of random alterations or combinations of these solutions and evaluates the new results against a fitness function. The most fit or promising results are selected for additional iterations, to achieve an overall optimal solution.

=== Graph traversal ===
Graph traversal is a technique for finding solutions to problems that can be represented as graphs. This approach is broad, and includes depth-first search, breadth-first search, tree traversal, and many specific variations that may include local optimizations and excluding search spaces that can be determined to be non-optimum or not possible. These techniques may be used to solve a variety of problems including shortest path and constraint satisfaction problems.

=== Greedy ===
A greedy approach begins by evaluating one possible outcome from the set of possible outcomes, and then searches locally for an improvement on that outcome. When a local improvement is found, it will repeat the process and again search locally for additional improvements near this local optimum. A greedy technique is generally simple to implement, and these series of decisions can be used to find local optimums depending on where the search began. However, greedy techniques may not identify the global optimum across the entire set of possible outcomes.,

=== Heuristic ===
A heuristic approach employs a practical method to reach an immediate solution not guaranteed to be optimal.

=== Learning ===
Learning techniques employ statistical methods to perform categorization and analysis without explicit programming. Supervised learning, unsupervised learning, reinforcement learning, and deep learning techniques are included in this category.

=== Mathematical optimization ===
Mathematical optimization is a technique that can be used to calculate a mathematical optimum by minimizing or maximizing a function.

=== Modeling ===
Modeling is a general technique for abstracting a real-world problem into a framework or paradigm that assists with solution.

=== Recursion ===
Recursion is a general technique for designing an algorithm that calls itself with a progressively simpler part of the task down to one or more base cases with defined results.

=== Sliding Window ===
The sliding window reduces the use of nested loops and replaces them with a single loop, thereby reducing the time complexity.

=== Two Pointers ===
Two pointers is an algorithmic technique that uses two indices (or pointers) to traverse a data structure, usually an array or string, often from different ends or at different speeds. It’s widely used to solve problems involving searching, sorting, or scanning with linear time complexity.

=== Backtracking ===
Backtracking is a general algorithmic technique used for solving problems recursively by trying to build a solution incrementally, one piece at a time, and removing those solutions that fail to satisfy the problem constraints as soon as possible.

== See also ==
- Algorithm engineering
- Algorithm characterizations
- Theory of computation
