= Random-access stored-program machine =

In theoretical computer science the random-access stored-program (RASP) machine model is an abstract machine used for the purposes of algorithm development and algorithm complexity theory.

The RASP is a random-access machine (RAM) model that, unlike the RAM, has its program in its "registers" together with its input. The registers are unbounded (infinite in capacity); whether the number of registers is finite is model-specific. Thus the RASP is to the RAM as the Universal Turing machine is to the Turing machine. The RASP is an example of the von Neumann architecture whereas the RAM is an example of the Harvard architecture.

The RASP is closest of all the abstract models to the common notion of computer. But unlike actual computers the RASP model usually has a very simple instruction set, greatly reduced from those of CISC and even RISC processors to the simplest arithmetic, register-to-register "moves", and "test/jump" instructions. Some models have a few extra registers such as an accumulator.

Together with the register machine, the RAM, and the pointer machine the RASP makes up the four common sequential machine models, called this to distinguish them from the "parallel" models (e.g. parallel random-access machine) [cf. van Emde Boas (1990)].

== Informal definition: random-access stored-program model (RASP) ==
Nutshell description of a RASP:

The RASP is a universal Turing machine (UTM) built on a random-access machine RAM chassis.

The reader will remember that the UTM is a Turing machine with a "universal" finite-state table of instructions that can interpret any well-formed "program" written on the tape as a string of Turing 5-tuples, hence its universality. While the classical UTM model expects to find Turing 5-tuples on its tape, any program-set imaginable can be put there given that the Turing machine expects to find them—given that its finite-state table can interpret them and convert them to the desired action. Along with the program, printed on the tape will be the input data/parameters/numbers (usually to the program's right), and eventually the output data/numbers (usually to the right of both, or intermingled with the input, or replacing it). The "user" must position the Turing machine's head over the first instruction, and the input must be placed in a specified place and format appropriate to both the program-on-tape and the finite-state machine's instruction-table.

The RASP mimics this construction: it places the "program" and "data" in the holes (registers). But unlike the UTM the RASP proceeds to "fetch" its instructions in a sequential manner, unless the conditional test sends it elsewhere.

A point of confusion: two sets of instructions: Unlike the UTM, the RASP model has two sets of instructions – the state machine table of instructions (the "interpreter") and the "program" in the holes. The two sets do not have to be drawn from the same set.

=== An example of a RAM working as a RASP ===
The following example of a program will move the contents of register (hole) #18 to register (hole) #19, erasing contents of #18 in the process.

    5: 03 18 15    JZ 18,15       ; if [18] is zero, jump to 15 to end the program
       02 18       DEC 18         ; Decrement [18]
       01 19       INC 19         ; Increment [19]
       03 15 05    JZ 15, 5       ; If [15] is zero, jump to 5 to repeat the loop (use Halt to simulate unconditional jump)
   15: 00          H              ; Halt

   18:  n                         ; Source value to copy
   19:                            ; Destination for copy

The program-instructions available in this RASP machine will be a simple set to keep the example short:

Instruction	Mnemonic	Action on register "r"	Action on finite state machine's Instruction Register, IR
INCrement	INC ( r )	[r] +1 → r	[IR] +1 → IR
DECrement	DEC ( r )	[r] -1 → r	[IR] +1 → IR
Jump if Zero	JZ ( r, z )	none	IF [r] = 0 THEN z → IR ELSE [IR] +1 → IR
Halt	H	none	[IR] → IR

To ease the example we will equip the state machine of the RAM-as-RASP with the primitive instructions drawn from the same set, but augmented with two indirect copy instructions:

RAM state machine instructions:

{ INC h; DEC h; JZ h,xxx; CPY ⟪h_{a}⟫,⟨h_{a}⟩; CPY ⟨h_{a}⟩,⟪h_{a}⟫ }

As the RASP machine's state machine interprets the program in the registers, what exactly will the state machine be doing? The column containing the exclamation mark ! will list in time sequence the state machine's actions as it "interprets" — converts to action — the program:

	PC	IR																	
hole # →	1	2	3	4	5	6	7	8	9	10	11	12	13	14	15	16	17	18	19
program, parameters →	5				JZ	18	15	DEC	18	INC	19	JZ	15	5	H			n	
encoded program →	5				3	18	15	2	18	1	19	3	15	5	0			n	
state machine instructions ↓																			
!																			

Tradition divides the state-machine's actions into two major "phases" called Fetch and Execute. We will observe below that there are "sub-phases" within these two major phases. There is no agreed-to convention; every model will require its own precise description.

==== Fetch phase ====
The state machine has access to all the registers, both directly and indirectly. So it adopts #1 as "the program counter" PC. The role of the program counter will be to "keep the place" in the program's listing; the state machine has its own state register for its private use.

Upon start, the state machine expects to find a number in the PC—the first "Program-Instruction" in the program (i.e. at #5).

(Without the use of the indirect COPYs, the task of getting the pointed-to program-instruction into #2 is a bit arduous. The state machine would indirectly decrement the pointed-to register while directly incrementing (empty) register #2. During the "parse" phase it will restore the sacrificed contents of #5 by sacrificing the count in #2.)

The point of the above detour is to show that life is much easier when the state machine has access to two kinds of indirect copy:

- copy indirect from i and direct to j: CPY ⟪h_{i}⟫,⟨h_{j}⟩
- copy direct from i and indirect to j: CPY ⟨h_{i}⟩,⟪h_{j}⟫

The following example shows what happens during the state-machine's "fetch" phase. The state-machine's operations are listed on the column labelled "State machine instruction ↓". Observe that at the end of the fetch, register #2 contains the numerical value 3 of the "operation code" ("opcode") of the first instruction JZ:

			PC	PIR																	
		hole # →	1	2	3	4	5	6	7	8	9	10	11	12	13	14	15	16	17	18	19
		program, parameters →	5				JZ	18	15	DEC	18	INC	19	JZ	15	5	H			n	
		encoded program →	5				3	18	15	2	18	1	19	3	15	5	0			n	
step		state machine instructions ↓																			
1	fetch_instr:	CPY ⟪1⟫,⟨2⟩	5 i	[3]			[3]	18	15	2	18	1	19	3	15	5	0			n	

==== Parse phase ====
Now that the number of the program-instruction (e.g. 3 = "JZ") is in register #2 -- the "Program-Instruction Register" PIR—the state machine proceeds to decrement the number until the IR is empty:

If the IR were empty before decrement then the program-instruction would be 0 = HALT, and the machine would jump to its "HALT" routine. After the first decrement, if the hole were empty the instruction would be INC, and the machine would jump to instruction "inc_routine". After the second decrement, the empty IR would represent DEC, and the machine would jump to the "dec_routine". After the third decrement, the IR is indeed empty, and this causes a jump to the "JZ_routine" routine. If an unexpected number were still in the IR, then the machine would have detected an error and could HALT (for example).

			PC	IR																	
		hole # →	1	2	3	4	5	6	7	8	9	10	11	12	13	14	15	16	17	18	19
		program, parameters →	5				JZ	18	15	DEC	18	INC	19	JZ	15	5	H			n	
		encoded program →	5				3	18	15	2	18	1	19	3	15	5	0			n	
		state machine instructions ↓																			
		CPY ⟪1⟫,⟨2⟩	5 i	[3]			[3]	18	15	2	18	1	19	3	15	5	0			n	
		JZ 2,halt	5	3			3	18	15	2	18	1	19	3	19	5	0			n	
3		DEC 2	5	2			3	18	15	2	18	1	19	3	15	5	0			n	
4		JZ 2,inc_routine:	5	2			3	18	15	2	18	1	19	3	15	5	0			n	
5		DEC 2	5	1			3	18	15	2	18	1	19	3	15	5	0			n	
6		JZ 2,dec_routine	5	1			3	18	15	2	18	1	19	3	15	5	0			n	
7		DEC 2	5	0			3	18	15	2	18	1	19	3	15	5	0			n	
8		JZ 2, JZ_routine	5	0 !																	
—	halt:	HALT	5	3			3	18	15	2	18	1	19	3	15	5	0			n	
—	inc_routine:	etc.	5	3			3	18	15	2	18	1	19	3	15	5	0			n	
—	dec_routine:	etc.	5	3			3	18	15	2	18	1	19	3	15	5	0			n	
9	JZ_routine:	etc.	5	3			3	18	15	2	18	1	19	3	15	5	0			n	

==== Execute phase, JZ_routine ====
Now the state machine knows what program-instruction to execute; indeed it has jumped to the "JZ_routine" sequence of instructions. The JZ instruction has 2 operands — (i) the number of the register to test, and (ii) the address to go to if the test is successful (the hole is empty).

(i) Operand fetch — which register to test for empty?: Analogous to the fetch phase, the finite state machine moves the contents of the register pointed to by the PC, i.e. hole #6, into the Program-Instruction Register PIR #2. It then uses the contents of register #2 to point to the register to be tested for zero, i.e. register #18. Hole #18 contains a number "n". To do the test, now the state machine uses the contents of the PIR to indirectly copy the contents of register #18 into a spare register, #3. So there are two eventualities (ia), register #18 is empty, (ib) register #18 is not empty.

(ia): If register #3 is empty then the state machine jumps to (ii) Second operand fetch — fetch the jump-to address.

(ib): If register #3 is not empty then the state machine can skip (ii) Second operand fetch. It simply increments twice the PC and then unconditionally jumps back to the instruction-fetch phase, where it fetches program-instruction #8 (DEC).

(ii) Operand fetch — jump-to address. If register #3 is empty, the state machine proceeds to use the PC to indirectly copy the contents of the register it points to (#8) into itself. Now the PC holds the jump-to address 15. Then the state machine unconditionally goes back to the instruction fetch phase, where it fetches program-instruction #15 (HALT).

			PC	IR																	
		hole # →	1	2	3	4	5	6	7	8	9	10	11	12	13	14	15	16	17	18	19
		program, parameters →	5				JZ	18	15	DEC	18	INC	19	JZ	15	5	H			n	
		encoded program →	5				3	18	15	2	18	1	19	3	15	5	0			n	
step		state machine instructions ↓																			
9	JZ_routine	INC 1	[6]	3			3	18	15	2	18	1	19	3	15	5	0			n	
10		CPY ⟪1⟫,⟨2⟩	6 i	[18]			3	[18]	15	2	18	1	19	3	15	5	0			n	
11	test hole:	CPY ⟪2⟫,⟨3⟩	6	18 i	[n]		3	18	15	2	18	1	19	3	15	5	0			[n]	
12	test hole:	JZ 3, jump	6	18 i	[n]		3	18	15	2	18	1	19	3	15	5	0			n	
					n															n	
13	no_jump:	INC 1	[7]	18	n		3	18	15	2	18	1	19	3	15	5	0			n	
14		INC 1	[8]	18	n		3	18	15	2	18	1	19	3	15	5	0			n	
15		J fetch_instr	8	18	n		3	18	15	2	18	1	19	3	15	5	0			n	
1	fetch_instr:	CPY ⟪1⟫,⟨2⟩	8 i	[2]	n		3	18	15	[2]	18	1	19	3	15	5	0			n	
2	parse:	etc.																			
13	jump:	INC 1	[7]	18	n		3	18	15	2	18	1	19	3	15	5	0			n	
14		CPY ⟪1⟫,⟨1⟩	[15]	18	n		3	18	[15]	2	18	1	19	3	15	5	0			n	
15		J fetch_instr	15	18	n		3	18	15	2	18	1	19	3	15	5	0			n	
1	fetch_instr:	CPY ⟪1⟫,⟨2⟩	15 i	[0]	n		3	18	15	2	18	1	19	3	15	5	[0]			n	
2	parse:	etc.																			

==== Execute phase INC, DEC ====
The following completes the RAM's state-machine interpretation of program-instructions, INC h, DEC h and thus completes the demonstration of how a RAM can "impersonate" a RASP:

Target program instruction set: { INC h; DEC h; JZ h,xxx, HALT }

Without indirect state-machine instructions INCi and DECi, to execute the INC and DEC program-instructions the state machine must use indirect copy to get the contents of the pointed-to register into spare register #3, DEC or INC it, and then use indirect copy to send it back to the pointed-to register.

			PC	IR																	
		hole # →	1	2	3	4	5	6	7	8	9	10	11	12	13	14	15	16	17	18	19
		program, parameters →	5				JZ	18	15	DEC	18	INC	19	JZ	15	5	H			n	
		encoded program →	5				3	18	15	2	18	1	19	3	15	5	0			n	
		state machine instructions ↓																			
15		J fetch_instr	8	18	n		3	18	15	2	18	1	19	3	15	5	0			n	
16	fetch_instr:	CPY ⟪1⟫,⟨2⟩	8 i	[2]	n		3	18	15	2	18	1	19	3	15	5	0			n	
17	parse:	JZ 2,halt	8	2	n		3	18	15	2	18	1	19	3	15	5	0			n	
18		DEC 2	8	[1]	n		3	18	15	2	18	1	19	3	15	5	0			n	
19		JZ 2, inc_routine:	8	1	n		3	18	15	2	18	1	19	3	15	5	0			n	
20		DEC 2	8	[0]	n		3	18	15	2	18	1	19	3	15	5	0			n	
21		JZ 2, dec_routine:	8	0 !	n		3	18	15	2	18	1	19	3	15	5	0			n	
22	dec_routine:	INC 1	9	0	n		3	18	15	2	18	1	19	3	15	5	0			n	
23		CPY ⟪1⟫,⟨2⟩	9 i	18	n		3	18	15	2	18	1	19	3	15	5	0			n	
24		CPY ⟪2⟫,⟨3⟩	9	18 i	n		3	18	15	2	18	1	19	3	15	5	0			n	
25		JZ 3,*+2	9	18	n		3	18	15	2	18	1	19	3	15	5	0			n	
26		DEC 3	9	18	n-1		3	18	15	2	18	1	19	3	15	5	0			n	
27		CPY ⟨3⟩,⟪2⟫	9	18 i	n-1		3	18	15	2	18	1	19	3	15	5	0			n-1	
28		INC 1	10	18	n-1		3	18	15	2	18	1	19	3	15	5	0			n-1	
29		J fetch_instr	10	18	n-1		3	18	15	2	18	1	19	3	15	5	0			n-1	
30	fetch_instr:	CPY ⟪1⟫,⟨2⟩	10 i	1	n-1		3	18	15	2	18	1	19	3	15	5	0			n-1	
31	parse:	JZ 2,halt	10	1	n-1		3	18	15	2	18	1	19	3	15	5	0			n-1	
32		DEC 2	10	0	n-1		3	18	15	2	18	1	19	3	15	5	0			n-1	
33		JZ 2,inc_routine:	10	0 !	n-1		3	18	15	2	18	1	19	3	15	5	0			n-1	
34	inc_routine:	INC 1	11	0	n-1		3	18	15	2	18	1	19	3	15	5	0			n-1	
35		CPY ⟪1⟫,⟨2⟩	11 i	19	n-1		3	18	15	2	18	1	19	3	15	5	0			n-1	
36		CPY ⟪2⟫,⟨3⟩	11	19 i	0		3	18	15	2	18	1	19	3	15	5	0			n-1	0
37		INC 3	11	19	1		3	18	15	2	18	1	19	3	15	5	0			n-1	0
38		CPY ⟨3⟩,⟪2⟫	11	19 i	1		3	18	15	2	18	1	19	3	15	5	0			n-1	1
39		INC 1	12	19	1		3	18	15	2	18	1	19	3	15	5	0			n-1	0
40		J fetch_instr	12	19	1		3	18	15	2	18	1	19	3	15	5	0			n-1	0
41	fetch_instr:	etc.	12	19	1		3	18	15	2	18	1	19	3	15	5	0			n-1	0

Alternate instructions: Although the demonstration resulted in a primitive RASP of only four instructions, the reader might imagine how an additional instruction such as "ADD ⟨h⟩" or "MULT ⟨h_{a}⟩,⟪h_{b}>might be done.

==== Self-Modifying RASP programs ====
When a RAM is acting as a RASP, something new has been gained: unlike the RAM, the RASP has the capacity for self-modification of its program-instructions (the state-machine instructions are frozen, unmodifiable by the machine). Cook-Reckhow (1971) (p. 75) comment on this in their description of their RASP model, as does Hartmanis (1971) (pp. 239ff)

An early description of this notion can be found in Goldstine-von Neumann (1946):

"We need an order [instruction] that can substitute a number into a given order... By means of such an order the results of a computation can be introduced into the instructions governing that or a different computation" (p. 93)

Such an ability makes the following possible:

- subroutines -- the calling routine (or perhaps the subroutine) stores the return address "return_address" in the subroutine's last command, i.e. "JMP return_address"
- so-called JUMP-tables
- self-modifying code

== RASP program-instruction set of Cook and Reckhow (1973) ==
In an influential paper Stephen A. Cook and Robert A. Reckhow define their version of a RASP:

"The Random Access Stored-Program Machine (RASP) described here is similar to the RASP's described by Hartmanis [1971]" (p. 74).

Their purpose was to compare execution-times of the various models: RAM, RASP and multi-tape Turing machine for use in the theory of complexity analysis.

The salient feature of their RASP model is no provision for indirect program-instructions (cf their discussion p. 75). This they achieve by requiring the program to modify itself: if necessary an instruction can modify the "parameter" (their word, i.e. "operand") of a particular instruction. They have designed their model so each "instruction" uses two consecutive registers, one for the "operation code" (their word) and the parameter "either an address or an integer constant".

Their RASP's registers are unbounded in capacity and unbounded in number; likewise their accumulator AC and instruction counter IC are unbounded. The instruction set is the following:

operation	mnemonic	operation code	description
load constant	LOD, k	1	put constant k into accumulator
add	ADD, j	2	add contents of register j to accumulator
subtract	SUB, j	3	subtract contents of register j from accumulator
store	STO, j	4	copy contents of accumulator into register j
branch on positive accumulator	BPA, xxx	5	IF contents of accumulator > 0 THEN jump to xxx ELSE next instruction
read	RD, j	6	next input into register j
print	PRI, j	7	output contents of register j
halt	HLT	any other - or + integer	stop
