= Reduction (complexity) =

Transformation of one computational problem to another

Example of a reduction from the boolean satisfiability problem (A ∨ B) ∧ (¬A ∨ ¬B ∨ ¬C) ∧ (¬A ∨ B ∨ C) to a vertex cover problem. The blue vertices form a minimum vertex cover, and the blue vertices in the gray oval correspond to a satisfying truth assignment for the original formula.

In computability theory and computational complexity theory, a reduction is an algorithm for transforming one problem into another problem. A sufficiently efficient reduction from one problem to another may be used to show that the second problem is at least as difficult as the first.

Intuitively, problem A is reducible to problem B, if an algorithm for solving problem B efficiently (if it exists) could also be used as a subroutine to solve problem A efficiently. When this is true, solving A cannot be harder than solving B. "Harder" means having a higher estimate of the required computational resources in a given context (e.g., higher time complexity, greater memory requirement, need for extra hardware processor cores for a parallel solution compared to a single-threaded solution, etc.). The existence of a reduction from A to B can be written in the shorthand notation A ≤_{m} B, usually with a subscript on the ≤ to indicate the type of reduction being used (m : many-one reduction, p : polynomial reduction).

The mathematical structure generated on a set of problems by the reductions of a particular type generally forms a preorder, whose equivalence classes may be used to define degrees of unsolvability and complexity classes.

== Introduction ==
There are two main situations where we need to use reductions:

- First, we find ourselves trying to solve a problem that is similar to a problem we've already solved. In these cases, often a quick way of solving the new problem is to transform each instance of the new problem into instances of the old problem, solve these using our existing solution, and then use these to obtain our final solution. This is perhaps the most obvious use of reductions.
- Second: suppose we have a problem that we've proven is hard to solve, and we have a similar new problem. We might suspect that it is also hard to solve. We argue by contradiction: suppose the new problem is easy to solve. Then, if we can show that every instance of the old problem can be solved easily by transforming it into instances of the new problem and solving those, we have a contradiction. This establishes that the new problem is also hard.

A very simple example of a reduction is from multiplication to squaring. Suppose all we know how to do is to add, subtract, take squares, and divide by two. We can use this knowledge, combined with the following formula, to obtain the product of any two numbers:

$$a \times b = \frac{\left(\left(a + b\right)^{2} - a^{2} - b^{2}\right)}{2}$$

We also have a reduction in the other direction; obviously, if we can multiply two numbers, we can square a number. This seems to imply that these two problems are equally hard. This kind of reduction corresponds to Turing reduction.

However, the reduction becomes much harder if we add the restriction that we can only use the squaring function one time, and only at the end. In this case, even if we're allowed to use all the basic arithmetic operations, including multiplication, no reduction exists in general, because in order to get the desired result as a square we have to compute its square root first, and this square root could be an irrational number like $\sqrt{2}$ that cannot be constructed by arithmetic operations on rational numbers. Going in the other direction, however, we can certainly square a number with just one multiplication, only at the end. Using this limited form of reduction, we have shown the unsurprising result that multiplication is harder in general than squaring. This corresponds to many-one reduction.

== Properties ==
Reducibility is a preordering, that is, a reflexive and transitive relation, on P(N)×P(N), where P(N) is the power set of the natural numbers.

== Types and applications of reductions ==
As described in the example above, there are two main types of reductions used in computational complexity theory, the many-one reduction and the Turing reduction. Many-one reductions map instances of one problem to instances of another; Turing reductions compute the solution to one problem, assuming the other problem is easy to solve. The many-one reduction is a stronger type of Turing reduction, and is more effective at separating problems into distinct complexity classes. However, the increased restrictions on many-one reductions make them more difficult to find.

A problem is complete for a complexity class if every problem in the class reduces to that problem, and it is also in the class itself. In this sense the problem represents the class, since any solution to it can, in combination with the reductions, be used to solve every problem in the class.

However, in order to be useful, reductions must be easy. For example, it's quite possible to reduce a difficult-to-solve NP-complete problem like the boolean satisfiability problem to a trivial problem, like determining if a number equals zero, by having the reduction machine solve the problem in exponential time and output zero only if there is a solution. However, this does not achieve much, because even though we can solve the new problem, performing the reduction is just as hard as solving the old problem. Likewise, a reduction computing a noncomputable function can reduce an undecidable problem to a decidable one. As Michael Sipser points out in Introduction to the Theory of Computation: "The reduction must be easy, relative to the complexity of typical problems in the class [...] If the reduction itself were difficult to compute, an easy solution to the complete problem wouldn't necessarily yield an easy solution to the problems reducing to it."

Therefore, the appropriate notion of reduction depends on the complexity class being studied. When studying the complexity class NP and many harder classes such as the polynomial hierarchy, polynomial-time reductions are used. When studying classes within P such as NC and NL, log-space reductions are used. When studying strong NP-completeness, where the magnitude of the numbers in an instance matters, pseudo-polynomial transformations are used, which additionally restrict the size of the numerical parameters in the output. Reductions are also used in computability theory to show whether problems are or are not solvable by machines at all; in this case, reductions are restricted only to computable functions (for many-one reductions) or oracle machines (for Turing reductions).

In the case of optimization (maximization or minimization) problems, we often think in terms of approximation-preserving reductions. Suppose we have two optimization problems such that instances of one problem can be mapped onto instances of the other, in a way that nearly optimal solutions to instances of the latter problem can be transformed back to yield nearly optimal solutions to the former. This way, if we have an optimization algorithm (or approximation algorithm) that finds near-optimal (or optimal) solutions to instances of problem B, and an efficient approximation-preserving reduction from problem A to problem B, by composition we obtain an optimization algorithm that yields near-optimal solutions to instances of problem A. Approximation-preserving reductions are often used to prove hardness of approximation results: if some optimization problem A is hard to approximate (under some complexity assumption) within a factor better than α for some α, and there is a β-approximation-preserving reduction from problem A to problem B, we can conclude that problem B is hard to approximate within factor α/β.

== Examples ==
- To show that a decision problem A is undecidable we must find a reduction from a decision problem that is already known to be undecidable to A. That reduction function must be a computable function. In particular, we often show that a problem A is undecidable by showing that the halting problem reduces to A.
- The complexity classes P, NP and PSPACE are closed under (many-one, "Karp") polynomial-time reductions.
- The complexity classes L, NL, P, NP and PSPACE are closed under log-space reduction.

=== Detailed example ===
The following example shows how to use reduction from the halting problem to prove that a language is undecidable. Suppose H(M, w) is the problem of determining whether a given Turing machine M halts (by accepting or rejecting) on input string w. This language is known to be undecidable. Suppose E(M) is the problem of determining whether the language a given Turing machine M accepts is empty (in other words, whether M accepts any strings at all). We show that E is undecidable by a reduction from H.

To obtain a contradiction, suppose R is a decider for E. We will use this to produce a decider S for H (which we know does not exist). Given input M and w (a Turing machine and some input string), define S(M, w) with the following behavior: S creates a Turing machine N that accepts only if the input string to N is w and M halts on input w, and does not halt otherwise. The decider S can now evaluate R(N) to check whether the language accepted by N is empty. If R accepts N, then the language accepted by N is empty, so in particular M does not halt on input w, so S can reject. If R rejects N, then the language accepted by N is nonempty, so M does halt on input w, so S can accept. Thus, if we had a decider R for E, we would be able to produce a decider S for the halting problem H(M, w) for any machine M and input w. Since we know that such an S cannot exist, it follows that the language E is also undecidable.

== See also ==
- Fine-grained reduction
- Gadget (computer science)
- Many-one reduction
- Parsimonious reduction
- Pseudo-polynomial transformation
- Reduction (recursion theory)
- Truth table reduction
- Turing reduction
