= ALL (complexity) =

In computability and complexity theory, ALL is the class of all decision problems.

== Relations to other classes ==
ALL contains all of the complex classes of decision problems, including RE and co-RE, and uncountably many languages that are neither RE nor co-RE. It is the largest complexity class, containing all other complexity classes.
