= T2 Temporal Prover =

Program analyzer research project

- Original author: Microsoft Research
- Developer: Microsoft
- Stable release: CADE_2017 / May 30, 2017; 8 years ago
- Written in: C, F#
- Operating system: Windows, Linux (Debian, Ubuntu), macOS
- Platform: .NET Framework, Mono
- Type: Program analyzer
- License: MIT License
- Website: www.microsoft.com/en-us/research/publication/t2-temporal-property-verification/
- Repository: github.com/mmjb/T2

T2 Temporal Prover is an automated program analyzer developed in the Terminator research project at Microsoft Research.

== Overview ==
T2 aims to find whether a program can run infinitely (called a termination analysis). It supports nested loops and recursive functions, pointers and side-effects, and function-pointers as well as concurrent programs. Like all programs for termination analysis it tries to solve the halting problem for particular cases, since the general problem is undecidable. It provides a solution which is sound, meaning that when it states that a program does always terminate, the result is dependable.

The source code is licensed under MIT License and hosted on GitHub.
