= Yuri Matiyasevich =

Russian mathematician and computer scientist (born 1947)

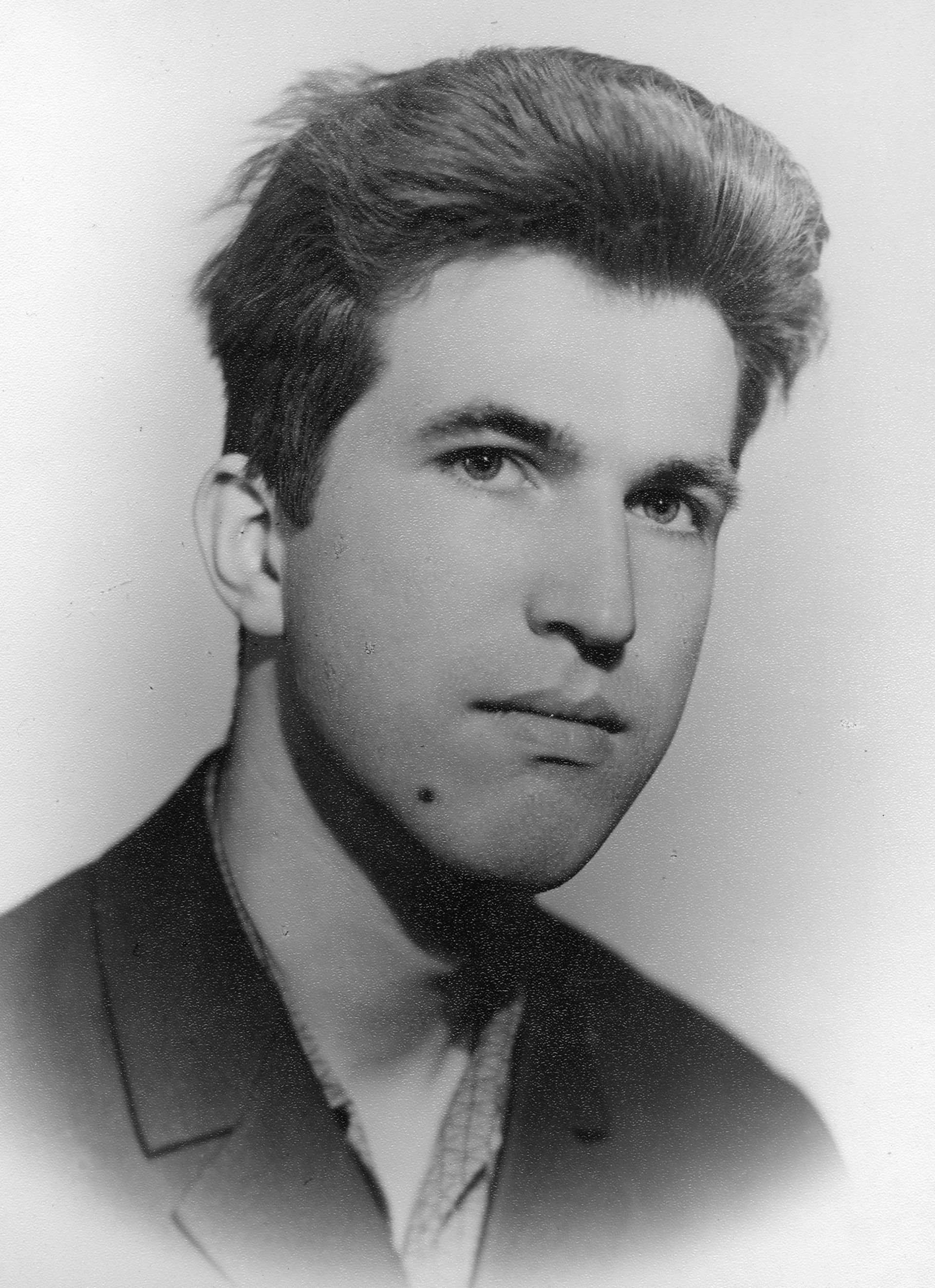
- Matiyasevich in 1969
- Born: 2 March 1947 (age 79); Leningrad, Soviet Union
- Education: Leningrad State University
- Known for: his contribution to computability theory, especially solving Hilbert's tenth problem, through Matiyasevich's theorem
- Awards: Petersburg Mathematical Society Prize (1970); Markov Prize (1980); Humboldt Award (1998)
- Scientific career
- Fields: Mathematics and Theoretical computer science
- Workplaces: Petersburg Department of Steklov Institute of Mathematics
- Website: Official website

Yuri Vladimirovich Matiyasevich (Russian: Ю́рий Влади́мирович Матиясе́вич; born 2 March 1947 in Leningrad) is a Russian mathematician and computer scientist. He is best known for his negative solution of Hilbert's tenth problem (Matiyasevich's theorem), which was presented in his 1972 doctoral thesis at LOMI (the Leningrad Department of the Steklov Institute of Mathematics). He continued to work at that institute, becoming a professor there in 1995.

== Biography ==
=== Early years and education ===
Yuri Matiyasevich was born in Leningrad on March 2, 1947. The first few classes he studied at school No. 255 with Sofia G. Generson, thanks to whom he became interested in mathematics. In 1961 he began to participate in all-Russian olympiads. From 1962 to 1963 he studied at Leningrad physical and mathematical school No. 239. Also from 7th to 9th grade he was involved in the mathematical circle of the Leningrad Palace of Pioneers. In 1963-1964 he completed 10th grade at the Moscow State University physics and mathematics boarding school No. 18 named after A. N. Kolmogorov.

In 1964, he won a gold medal at the International Mathematical Olympiad and was enrolled in the Mathematics and Mechanics Department of St. Petersburg State University without exams. He took his high school diploma exams as a first-year student.

Being a second-year student, he released two papers in mathematical logic that were published in the Proceedings of the USSR Academy of Sciences. He presented these works at the International Congress of Mathematicians in 1966.

After graduation, he enrolled in graduate school at St. Petersburg Department of Steklov Mathematical Institute of the Russian Academy of Sciences (POMI). In 1970, under the guidance of Sergei Maslov, he defended his thesis for the degree of Candidate of Sciences in Physics and Mathematics.

In 1972, at the age of 25, he defended his doctoral dissertation on the unsolvability of Hilbert's tenth problem. Using Fibonacci numbers, he managed to show that solutions to Diophantine equations may grow exponentially. Earlier work by Julia Robinson, Martin Davis and Hilary Putnam had shown that this suffices to prove that every computably enumerable set is Diophantine, a result which solves Hilbert's tenth problem and is now known as the MRDP theorem.

From 1974 Matiyasevich worked in scientific positions at LOMI, first as a senior researcher, in 1980 he headed the Laboratory of Mathematical Logic. In 1995, Matiyasevich became a professor at POMI, initially at the chair of software engineering, later at the chair of algebra and number theory.

In 1997, he was elected as a corresponding member of the Russian Academy of Sciences. Since 1998, Yuri Matiyasevich has been a vice-president of the St. Petersburg Mathematical Society. Since 2002, he has been a head of the St.Petersburg City Mathematical Olympiad.

Since 2003, Matiyasevich has been a co-director of an annual German–Russian student school JASS.

In 2008, he was elected as a full member of Russian Academy of Sciences.

He was a member of the American Mathematical Society and the Association for Symbolic Logic; and also of the editorial boards for the journals Discrete Mathematics and Applications and Computer Instruments in Education. As a teacher, he mentored Eldar Musayev, Maxim Vsemirnov, Alexei Pastor, Dmitri Karpov.

A polynomial related to the colorings of a triangulation of a sphere was named after Matiyasevich; see The Matiyasevich polynomial, four colour theorem and weight systems.

== Awards and honors ==
- 1964: Gold medal at the International Mathematical Olympiad held in Moscow.
- 1970: "Young mathematician prize" of the Leningrad Mathematical Society.
- 1980: Markov Prize of Academy of Sciences of the USSR.
- 1996: Honorary Degree, Université d'Auvergne.
- 1998: He received Humboldt Research Award.
- 2003: Honorary Degree, Université Pierre et Marie Curie (UPMC).
- 2007: Member of the Bavarian Academy of Sciences.

== Selected works ==
- At the age of 22, he came up with a negative solution proof for Hilbert's tenth problem (Matiyasevich's theorem), which was presented in his doctoral thesis at LOMI (the Leningrad Department of the Steklov Institute of Mathematics).
- In number theory, he answered George Pólya's question of 1927 regarding an infinite system of inequalities linking the Taylor coefficients of the Riemann $\zeta$-function. He proved that all these inequalities are a consequence of a single functional inequality linking the Fourier transform of a $\zeta$-function and its derivatives.
- In graph theory, he found an unexpected connection between the four color theorem and divisibility of binomial coefficients, and gave a probabilistic interpretation of the four color theorem.
- He discovered a number of new interesting qualities of the zeros of the Riemann $\zeta$-function.

=== Book ===
- Matiyasevich, Yuri V. (1993). Hilbert's Tenth Problem. Foundations of Computing. Foreword by Martin Davis. Cambridge, MA: MIT Press. ISBN 9780262132954. OCLC 908983760. — Foreword by Martin Davis and Hilary Putnam

=== Papers ===
- — (1970). "The diophantineness of enumerable sets". Doklady Akademii Nauk SSSR (in Russian). 191: 279–282.
- — (1973). "Real-time recognition of the inclusion relation" (PDF). Journal of Soviet Mathematics. 1 (1): 64–70. doi:10.1007/bf01117471. ISSN 0090-4104. S2CID 121919479.
- —; Robinson, Julia (1975). "Reduction of an arbitrary Diophantine equation to one in 13 unknowns". Acta Arithmetica. 27: 521–553. doi:10.4064/aa-27-1-521-553. ISSN 0065-1036.
- —; Sénizergues, Géraud (July 1996). "Decision Problems for Semi-Thue Systems with a Few Rules". Proceedings, 11th Annual IEEE Symposium on Logic in Computer Science (LICS '96). LICS '96. New Brunswick, NJ: IEEE Computer Society Press. pp. 523–531. doi:10.1109/LICS.1996.561469. ISBN 0-8186-7463-6.
- — (c. 1997). "Proof Procedures as Bases for Metamathematical Proofs in Discrete Mathematics". Personal Journal of Yuri Matiyasevich.
- — (1997). "Elimination of bounded universal quantifiers standing in front of a quantifier-free arithmetical formula". Personal Journal of Yuri Matiyasevich.
- — (4 July 1997). "A Polynomial related to Colourings of Triangulation of Sphere". Personal Journal of Yuri Matiyasevich.
- — (2004). "Some Probabilistic Restatements of the Four Color Conjecture". Journal of Graph Theory. 46 (3): 167–179. doi:10.1002/jgt.10178. ISSN 0364-9024. S2CID 30591818.

== See also ==
- Matiyasevich's theorem

== Sources ==
- Beltyukov, A. P. (2017). "To the anniversary of Yuri Vladimirovich Matiyasevich". Computer Tools in Education (6): 5–11.
- Varpahovsky, F.; Varpahovsky, A. (1970). "On solving Hilbert's tenth problem". Kvant (7): 38–44.
