= Polynomial-time reduction =

Method for solving one problem using another

In computational complexity theory, a polynomial-time reduction is a method for solving one problem using another. One shows that if a hypothetical subroutine solving the second problem exists, then the first problem can be solved by transforming or reducing it to inputs for the second problem and calling the subroutine one or more times. If both the time required to transform the first problem to the second and the number of times the subroutine is called are polynomial, then the first problem is polynomial-time reducible to the second.

A polynomial-time reduction proves that the first problem is no more difficult than the second one, because whenever an efficient algorithm exists for the second problem, one exists for the first problem as well. By contraposition, if no efficient algorithm exists for the first problem, none exists for the second either. Polynomial-time reductions are frequently used in complexity theory for defining both complexity classes and complete problems for those classes.

== Types of reductions ==
The three most common types of polynomial-time reduction, from the most to the least restrictive, are polynomial-time many-one reductions, truth-table reductions, and Turing reductions. The most frequently used of these are the many-one reductions, and in some cases the phrase "polynomial-time reduction" may be used to mean a polynomial-time many-one reduction. The most general reductions are the Turing reductions and the most restrictive are the many-one reductions with truth-table reductions occupying the space in between.

=== Many-one reductions ===
A polynomial-time many-one reduction from a problem A to a problem B (both of which are usually required to be decision problems) is a polynomial-time algorithm for transforming inputs to problem A into inputs to problem B, such that the transformed problem has the same output as the original problem. An instance x of problem A can be solved by applying this transformation to produce an instance y of problem B, giving y as the input to an algorithm for problem B, and returning its output. Polynomial-time many-one reductions may also be known as polynomial transformations or Karp reductions, named after Richard Karp. A reduction of this type is denoted by $A \le_m^P B$ or $A \le_p B$.

=== Truth-table reductions ===
A polynomial-time truth-table reduction from a problem A to a problem B (both decision problems) is a polynomial time algorithm for transforming inputs to problem A into a fixed number of inputs to problem B, such that the output for the original problem can be expressed as a function of the outputs for B. The function that maps outputs for B into the output for A must be the same for all inputs, so that it can be expressed by a truth table. A reduction of this type may be denoted by the expression $A \le_{tt}^P B$.

=== Turing reductions ===
A polynomial-time Turing reduction from a problem A to a problem B is an algorithm that solves problem A using a polynomial number of calls to a subroutine for problem B, and polynomial time outside of those subroutine calls. Polynomial-time Turing reductions are also known as Cook reductions, named after Stephen Cook. A reduction of this type may be denoted by the expression $A \le_T^P B$. Many-one reductions can be regarded as restricted variants of Turing reductions where the number of calls made to the subroutine for problem B is exactly one and the value returned by the reduction is the same value as the one returned by the subroutine.

== Completeness ==
A complete problem for a given complexity class C and reduction ≤ is a problem P that belongs to C, such that every problem A in C has a reduction A ≤ P. For instance, a problem is NP-complete if it belongs to NP and all problems in NP have polynomial-time many-one reductions to it. A problem that belongs to NP can be proven to be NP-complete by finding a single polynomial-time many-one reduction to it from a known NP-complete problem. Polynomial-time many-one reductions have been used to define complete problems for other complexity classes, including the PSPACE-complete languages and EXPTIME-complete languages.

Every decision problem in P (the class of polynomial-time decision problems) may be reduced to every other nontrivial decision problem (where nontrivial means that not every input has the same output), by a polynomial-time many-one reduction. To transform an instance of problem A to B, solve A in polynomial time, and then use the solution to choose one of two instances of problem B with different answers. Therefore, for complexity classes within P such as L, NL, NC, and P itself, polynomial-time reductions cannot be used to define complete languages: if they were used in this way, every nontrivial problem in P would be complete. Instead, weaker reductions such as log-space reductions or NC reductions are used for defining classes of complete problems for these classes, such as the P-complete problems.

== Defining complexity classes ==
The definitions of the complexity classes NP, PSPACE, and EXPTIME do not involve reductions: reductions come into their study only in the definition of complete languages for these classes. However, in some cases a complexity class may be defined by reductions. If C is any decision problem, then one can define a complexity class C consisting of the languages A for which $A \le_m^P C$. In this case, C will automatically be complete for C, but C may have other complete problems as well.

An example of this is the complexity class $\exists \mathbb{R}$ defined from the existential theory of the reals, a computational problem that is known to be NP-hard and in PSPACE, but is not known to be complete for NP, PSPACE, or any language in the polynomial hierarchy. $\exists \mathbb{R}$ is the set of problems having a polynomial-time many-one reduction to the existential theory of the reals; it has several other complete problems such as determining the rectilinear crossing number of an undirected graph. Each problem in $\exists \mathbb{R}$ inherits the property of belonging to PSPACE, and each $\exists \mathbb{R}$-complete problem is NP-hard.

Similarly, the complexity class GI consists of the problems that can be reduced to the graph isomorphism problem. Since graph isomorphism is known to belong both to NP and co-AM, the same is true for every problem in this class. A problem is GI-complete if it is complete for this class; the graph isomorphism problem itself is GI-complete, as are several other related problems.

== See also ==
- Karp's 21 NP-complete problems
