= Computable set =

Set with algorithmic membership test

In computability theory, a set of natural numbers is computable (or decidable, or recursive) if there is an algorithm that computes the membership of every natural number in a finite number of steps. Formally, a subset $S$ of the natural numbers is computable if there exists a total computable function $f$ such that

$$f(x) = \begin{cases}
1 & \text{if }\,x\in S, \\
0 & \text{if }\,x\not\in S.
\end{cases}$$

== Examples ==
- Every recursive language is computable.
- Every finite or cofinite subset of the natural numbers is computable.
  - The empty set is computable.
  - The entire set of natural numbers is computable.
  - Every natural number is computable. (Note: That is, under the set-theoretic definition of natural numbers, the set of natural numbers less than a given natural number is computable.)
- The subset of prime numbers is computable.
- The set of Gödel numbers is computable.

=== Non-computable sets ===
- The set of Turing machines that halt is not computable.
- The set of pairs of homeomorphic finite simplicial complexes is not computable.
- The set of busy beaver champions is not computable.
- Hilbert's tenth problem is not computable.

== Properties ==
Both A, B are sets in this section.

- If A is computable then the complement of A is computable.
- If A and B are computable then:
  - A ∩ B is computable.
  - A ∪ B is computable.
  - The image of A × B under the Cantor pairing function is computable.

In general, the image of a computable set under a computable function is computably enumerable, but possibly not computable.

- A is computable if and only if A and the complement of A are both computably enumerable(c.e.).
- The preimage of a computable set under a total computable function is computable.
- The image of a computable set under a total computable bijection is computable.

A is computable if and only if it is at level $\Delta^0_1$ of the arithmetical hierarchy.

A is computable if and only if it is either the image (or range) of a nondecreasing total computable function, or the empty set.

== See also ==
- Computably enumerable
- Decidability (logic)
- Recursively enumerable language
- Recursive language
- Recursion

== Notes ==
- Cutland, Nigel (1980). Computability: An Introduction to Recursive Function Theory. Cambridge University Press. ISBN 0-521-22384-9.
- Rogers, Hartley, Jr (1967). Theory of Recursive Functions and Effective Computability (1987 reprint ed.). Cambridge, MA: MIT Press. ISBN 0-262-68052-1.
- Soare, Robert I. (1987). Recursively Enumerable Sets and Degrees. Perspectives in Mathematical Logic. Berlin, Heidelberg: Springer. ISBN 3-540-15299-7.
