= UTM theorem =

Affirms the existence of a computable universal function

In computability theory, the UTM theorem, or universal Turing machine theorem, is a basic result about Gödel numberings of the set of computable functions. It affirms the existence of a computable universal function, which is capable of calculating any other computable function. The universal function is an abstract version of the universal Turing machine, thus the name of the theorem.

Roger's equivalence theorem provides a characterization of the Gödel numbering of the computable functions in terms of the s_{mn} theorem and the UTM theorem.

== Theorem ==
The theorem states that a partial, computable function u of two variables exists such that, for every computable function f of one variable, a number e exists such that $f(x) \simeq u(e,x)$ for all x. This means that, for each x, either f(x) and u(e,x) are both defined and are equal, or are both undefined.

The theorem thus shows that, defining φ_{e}(x) as u(e, x), the sequence φ_{1}, φ_{2}, ... is an enumeration (numbering) of the partial computable functions. In fact, u can be chosen so this is the standard numbering. The function $u$ in the statement of the theorem is called a universal function.
