= Lie group–Lie algebra correspondence =

Correspondence between topics in Lie theory

In mathematics, Lie group–Lie algebra correspondence allows one to correspond a Lie group to a Lie algebra or vice versa, and study the conditions for such a relationship. Lie groups that are isomorphic to each other have Lie algebras that are isomorphic to each other, but the converse is not necessarily true. One obvious counterexample is $\mathbb{R}^n$ and $\mathbb{T}^n$ (see real coordinate space and the circle group respectively) which are non-isomorphic to each other as Lie groups but their Lie algebras are isomorphic to each other, being $\mathbb{R}^n$ with a trivial bracket. However, for simply connected Lie groups, the Lie group-Lie algebra correspondence is one-to-one.

In this article, a Lie group refers to a real Lie group. For the complex and p-adic cases, see complex Lie group and p-adic Lie group. In this article, manifolds (in particular Lie groups) are assumed to be second countable; in particular, they have at most countably many connected components.

== Basics ==
=== The Lie algebra of a Lie group ===
There are various ways one can understand the construction of the Lie algebra of a Lie group G. One approach uses left-invariant vector fields. A vector field X on G is said to be invariant under left translations if, for any g, h in G,

$$(dL_g)_h(X_h) = X_{gh}$$

where $L_g: G \to G$ is defined by $L_g(x) = gx$ and $(dL_g)_h: T_h G \to T_{gh} G$ is the differential of $L_g$ between tangent spaces.

Let $\operatorname{Lie}(G)$ be the set of all left-translation-invariant vector fields on G. It is a real vector space. Moreover, it is closed under the Lie bracket of vector fields; i.e., $[X, Y]$ is a left-translation-invariant vector field if X and Y are. Thus, $\operatorname{Lie}(G)$ is a Lie subalgebra of the Lie algebra of all vector fields on G and is called the Lie algebra of G. One can understand this more concretely by identifying the space of left-invariant vector fields with the tangent space at the identity, as follows: Given a left-invariant vector field, one can take its value at the identity, and given a tangent vector at the identity, one can extend it to a left-invariant vector field. This correspondence is one-to-one in both directions, so is bijective. Thus, the Lie algebra can be thought of as the tangent space at the identity and the bracket of X and Y in $T_e G$ can be computed by extending them to left-invariant vector fields, taking the bracket of the vector fields, and then evaluating the result at the identity.

There is also another incarnation of $\operatorname{Lie}(G)$ as the Lie algebra of primitive elements of the Hopf algebra of distributions on G with support at the identity element; for this, see Related constructions below.

=== Matrix Lie groups ===
Suppose G is a closed subgroup of GL(n;C), and thus a Lie group, by the closed subgroups theorem. Then the Lie algebra of G may be computed as

$$\operatorname{Lie}(G) = \left\{ X \in M(n;\Complex) \mid e^{tX} \in G \text{ for all } t \in \R \right\}.$$

For example, one can use the criterion to establish the correspondence for classical compact groups (cf. the table in "compact Lie groups" below.)

=== Homomorphisms ===
If $f: G \to H$ is a Lie group homomorphism, then its differential at the identity element

$$df = df_e: \operatorname{Lie}(G) \to \operatorname{Lie}(H)$$

is a Lie algebra homomorphism (brackets go to brackets), which has the following properties:

- $\exp(df(X))=f(\exp(X))$ for all X in Lie(G), where "exp" is the exponential map
- $\operatorname{Lie}(\ker(f)) = \ker(df)$.
- If the image of f is closed, then $\operatorname{Lie}(\operatorname{im}(f)) = \operatorname{im}(df)$ and the first isomorphism theorem holds: f induces the isomorphism of Lie groups:
  $$G/\ker(f) \to \operatorname{im}(f).$$
- The chain rule holds: if $f: G \to H$ and $g: H \to K$ are Lie group homomorphisms, then $d(g \circ f) = (dg) \circ (df)$.

In particular, if H is a closed subgroup of a Lie group G, then $\operatorname{Lie}(H)$ is a Lie subalgebra of $\operatorname{Lie}(G)$. Also, if f is injective, then f is an immersion and so G is said to be an immersed (Lie) subgroup of H. For example, $G/\ker(f)$ is an immersed subgroup of H. If f is surjective, then f is a submersion and if, in addition, G is compact, then f is a principal bundle with the structure group its kernel. (Ehresmann's lemma)

=== Other properties ===
Let $G = G_1 \times \cdots \times G_r$ be a direct product of Lie groups and $p_i: G \to G_i$ projections. Then the differentials $dp_i: \operatorname{Lie}(G) \to \operatorname{Lie}(G_i)$ give the canonical identification:

$$\operatorname{Lie}(G_1 \times \cdots \times G_r) = \operatorname{Lie}(G_1) \oplus \cdots \oplus \operatorname{Lie}(G_r) .$$

If $H, H'$ are Lie subgroups of a Lie group, then $\operatorname{Lie}(H \cap H') = \operatorname{Lie}(H) \cap \operatorname{Lie}(H').$

Let G be a connected Lie group. If H is a Lie group, then any Lie group homomorphism $f: G \to H$ is uniquely determined by its differential $df$. Precisely, there is the exponential map $\exp : \operatorname{Lie}(G) \to G$ (and one for H) such that $f(\exp(X)) = \exp(df(X))$ and, since G is connected, this determines f uniquely. In general, if U is a neighborhood of the identity element in a connected topological group G, then $\bigcup_{n > 0} U^n$ coincides with G, since the former is an open (hence closed) subgroup. Now, $\exp : \operatorname{Lie}(G) \to G$ defines a local homeomorphism from a neighborhood of the zero vector to the neighborhood of the identity element. For example, if G is the Lie group of invertible real square matrices of size n (general linear group), then $\operatorname{Lie}(G)$ is the Lie algebra of real square matrices of size n and $\exp(X) = e^X = \sum_0^\infty {X^j / j!}$.

== The correspondence ==
The correspondence between Lie groups and Lie algebras includes the following three main results.

- Lie's third theorem: Every finite-dimensional real Lie algebra is the Lie algebra of some simply connected Lie group.
- The homomorphisms theorem: If $\phi: \operatorname{Lie}(G) \to \operatorname{Lie}(H)$ is a Lie algebra homomorphism and if G is simply connected, then there exists a (unique) Lie group homomorphism $f: G \to H$ such that $\phi = df$.
- The subgroups–subalgebras theorem: If G is a Lie group and $\mathfrak{h}$ is a Lie subalgebra of $\operatorname{Lie}(G)$, then there is a unique connected Lie subgroup (not necessarily closed) H of G with Lie algebra $\mathfrak{h}$.

In the second part of the correspondence, the assumption that G is simply connected cannot be omitted. For example, the Lie algebras of SO(3) and SU(2) are isomorphic, but there is no corresponding homomorphism of SO(3) into SU(2). Rather, the homomorphism goes from the simply connected group SU(2) to the non-simply connected group SO(3). If G and H are both simply connected and have isomorphic Lie algebras, the above result allows one to show that G and H are isomorphic. One method to construct f is to use the Baker–Campbell–Hausdorff formula.

For readers familiar with category theory the correspondence can be summarised as follows: First, the operation of associating to each connected Lie group $G$ its Lie algebra $\operatorname{Lie}(G)$, and to each homomorphism $f$ of Lie groups the corresponding differential $\operatorname{Lie}(f)=df_e$ at the neutral element, is a (covariant) functor $\operatorname{Lie}$ from the category of connected (real) Lie groups to the category of finite-dimensional (real) Lie-algebras. This functor has a left adjoint functor $\Gamma$ from (finite dimensional) Lie algebras to Lie groups (which is necessarily unique up to canonical isomorphism). In other words there is a natural isomorphism of bifunctors

$$\mathrm{Hom}_{CLGrp}(\Gamma(\mathfrak{g}), H) \cong \mathrm{Hom}_{LAlg}(\mathfrak{g},\operatorname{Lie}(H)).$$

$\Gamma(\mathfrak{g})$ is the (up to isomorphism unique) simply-connected Lie group with Lie algebra $\mathfrak{g}$. The associated natural unit morphisms $\epsilon\colon\mathfrak{g} \rightarrow \operatorname{Lie}(\Gamma(\mathfrak{g}))$ of the adjunction are isomorphisms, which corresponds to $\Gamma$ being fully faithful (part of the second statement above). The corresponding counit $\Gamma(\operatorname{Lie}(H)) \rightarrow H$ is the canonical projection $\widetilde{H}\rightarrow H$ from the simply connected covering; its surjectivity corresponds to $Lie$ being a faithful functor.

=== Proof of Lie's third theorem ===
Perhaps the most elegant proof of the first result above uses Ado's theorem, which says any finite-dimensional Lie algebra (over a field of any characteristic) is a Lie subalgebra of the Lie algebra $\mathfrak{gl}_n$ of square matrices. The proof goes as follows: by Ado's theorem, we assume $\mathfrak{g} \subset \mathfrak{gl}_n(\mathbb{R}) = \operatorname{Lie}(GL_n(\mathbb{R}))$ is a Lie subalgebra. Let G be the closed (without taking the closure one can get pathological dense example as in the case of the irrational winding of the torus) subgroup of $GL_n(\mathbb{R})$ generated by $e^{\mathfrak{g}}$ and let $\widetilde{G}$ be a simply connected covering of G; it is not hard to show that $\widetilde{G}$ is a Lie group and that the covering map is a Lie group homomorphism. Since $T_e \widetilde{G} = T_e G = \mathfrak{g}$, this completes the proof.

Example: Each element X in the Lie algebra $\mathfrak{g} = \operatorname{Lie}(G)$ gives rise to the Lie algebra homomorphism

$$\mathbb{R} \to \mathfrak{g}, \, t \mapsto tX.$$

By Lie's third theorem, as $\operatorname{Lie}(\mathbb{R}) = T_0 \mathbb{R} = \mathbb{R}$ and exp for it is the identity, this homomorphism is the differential of the Lie group homomorphism $\mathbb{R} \to H$ for some immersed subgroup H of G. This Lie group homomorphism, called the one-parameter subgroup generated by X, is precisely the exponential map $t \mapsto \exp(tX)$ and H its image. The preceding can be summarized to saying that there is a canonical bijective correspondence between $\mathfrak{g}$ and the set of one-parameter subgroups of G.

=== Proof of the homomorphisms theorem ===
One approach to proving the second part of the Lie group-Lie algebra correspondence (the homomorphisms theorem) is to use the Baker–Campbell–Hausdorff formula, as in Section 5.7 of Hall's book. Specifically, given the Lie algebra homomorphism $\phi$ from $\operatorname{Lie}(G)$ to $\operatorname{Lie}(H)$, we may define $f: G \to H$ locally (i.e., in a neighborhood of the identity) by the formula

$$f(e^X) = e^{\phi(X)} ,$$

where $e^X$ is the exponential map for G, which has an inverse defined near the identity. We now argue that f is a local homomorphism. Thus, given two elements near the identity $e^X$ and $e^Y$ (with X and Y small), we consider their product $e^X e^Y$. According to the Baker–Campbell–Hausdorff formula, we have $e^X e^Y = e^Z$, where

$$Z = X + Y + \frac{1}{2}[X,Y] + \frac{1}{12}[X,[X,Y]] + \cdots ,$$

with $\cdots$ indicating other terms expressed as repeated commutators involving X and Y. Thus,

$$f\left(e^X e^Y\right) = f\left(e^Z\right) = e^{\phi(Z)} = e^{\phi(X)+\phi(Y) + \frac{1}{2}[\phi(X),\phi(Y)] +\frac{1}{12}[\phi(X),[\phi(X),\phi(Y)]]+\cdots},$$

because $\phi$ is a Lie algebra homomorphism. Using the Baker–Campbell–Hausdorff formula again, this time for the group H, we see that this last expression becomes $e^{\phi(X)}e^{\phi(Y)}$, and therefore we have

$$f\left(e^X e^Y\right) = e^{\phi(X)} e^{\phi(Y)} = f\left(e^X\right) f\left(e^Y\right).$$

Thus, f has the homomorphism property, at least when X and Y are sufficiently small. This argument is only local, since the exponential map is only invertible in a small neighborhood of the identity in G and since the Baker–Campbell–Hausdorff formula only holds if X and Y are small. The assumption that G is simply connected has not yet been used.

The next stage in the argument is to extend f from a local homomorphism to a global one. The extension is done by defining f along a path and then using the simple connectedness of G to show that the definition is independent of the choice of path.

== Lie group representations ==
A special case of Lie correspondence is a correspondence between finite-dimensional representations of a Lie group and representations of the associated Lie algebra.

The general linear group $GL_n(\mathbb{C})$ is a (real) Lie group and any Lie group homomorphism

$$\pi: G \to GL_n(\mathbb{C})$$

is called a representation of the Lie group G. The differential

$$d\pi: \mathfrak{g} \to \mathfrak{gl}_n(\mathbb{C}),$$

is then a Lie algebra homomorphism called a Lie algebra representation. (The differential $d \pi$ is often simply denoted by $\pi'$.)

The homomorphisms theorem (mentioned above as part of the Lie group-Lie algebra correspondence) then says that if $G$ is the simply connected Lie group whose Lie algebra is $\mathfrak{g}$, every representation of $\mathfrak{g}$ comes from a representation of G. The assumption that G be simply connected is essential. Consider, for example, the rotation group SO(3), which is not simply connected. There is one irreducible representation of the Lie algebra in each dimension, but only the odd-dimensional representations of the Lie algebra come from representations of the group. (This observation is related to the distinction between integer spin and half-integer spin in quantum mechanics.) On the other hand, the group SU(2) is simply connected with Lie algebra isomorphic to that of SO(3), so every representation of the Lie algebra of SO(3) does give rise to a representation of SU(2).

=== The adjoint representation ===
An example of a Lie group representation is the adjoint representation of a Lie group G; each element g in a Lie group G defines an automorphism of G by conjugation: $c_g(h) = ghg^{-1}$; the differential $d c_g$ is then an automorphism of the Lie algebra $\mathfrak{g}$. This way, we get a representation $\operatorname{Ad}: G \to GL(\mathfrak{g}), \, g \mapsto dc_g$, called the adjoint representation. The corresponding Lie algebra homomorphism $\mathfrak{g} \to \mathfrak{gl}(\mathfrak{g})$ is called the adjoint representation of $\mathfrak{g}$ and is denoted by $\operatorname{ad}$. One can show $\operatorname{ad}(X)(Y) = [X, Y]$, which in particular implies that the Lie bracket of $\mathfrak{g}$ is determined by the group law on G.

By Lie's third theorem, there exists a subgroup $\operatorname{Int}(\mathfrak{g})$ of $GL(\mathfrak{g})$ whose Lie algebra is $\operatorname{ad}(\mathfrak{g})$. ($\operatorname{Int}(\mathfrak{g})$ is in general not a closed subgroup; only an immersed subgroup.) It is called the adjoint group of $\mathfrak{g}$. If G is connected, it fits into the exact sequence:

$$0 \to Z(G) \to G \xrightarrow{\operatorname{Ad}} \operatorname{Int}(\mathfrak{g}) \to 0$$

where $Z(G)$ is the center of G. If the center of G is discrete, then Ad here is a covering map.

Let G be a connected Lie group. Then G is unimodular if and only if $\det(\operatorname{Ad}(g)) = 1$ for all g in G.

Let G be a Lie group acting on a manifold X and G_{x} the stabilizer of a point x in X. Let $\rho(x): G \to X, \, g \mapsto g \cdot x$. Then

- $\operatorname{Lie}(G_x) = \ker(d \rho(x): T_eG \to T_x X) .$
- If the orbit $G \cdot x$ is locally closed, then the orbit is a submanifold of X and $T_x (G \cdot x) = \operatorname{im}(d \rho(x): T_eG \to T_x X)$.

For a subset A of $\mathfrak{g}$ or G, let

$$\mathfrak{z}_{\mathfrak{g}}(A) = \{ X \in \mathfrak{g} \mid \operatorname{ad}(a)X = 0 \text{ or } \operatorname{Ad}(a)X = 0 \text{ for all } a \text{ in } A\}$$
$$Z_G(A) = \{ g \in G \mid \operatorname{Ad}(g)a = 0 \text{ or } ga = ag \text{ for all } a \text{ in } A \}$$

be the Lie algebra centralizer and the Lie group centralizer of A. Then $\operatorname{Lie}(Z_G(A)) = \mathfrak{z}_{\mathfrak{g}}(A)$.

If H is a closed connected subgroup of G, then H is normal if and only if $\operatorname{Lie}(H)$ is an ideal and in such a case $\operatorname{Lie}(G/H) = \operatorname{Lie}(G)/\operatorname{Lie}(H)$.

== Abelian Lie groups ==
Let G be a connected Lie group. Since the Lie algebra of the center of G is the center of the Lie algebra of G (cf. the previous §), G is abelian if and only if its Lie algebra is abelian.

If G is abelian, then the exponential map $\exp: \mathfrak{g} \to G$ is a surjective group homomorphism. The kernel of it is a discrete group (since the dimension is zero) called the integer lattice of G and is denoted by $\Gamma$. By the first isomorphism theorem, $\exp$ induces the isomorphism $\mathfrak{g}/\Gamma \to G$.

By the rigidity argument, the fundamental group $\pi_1(G)$ of a connected Lie group G is a central subgroup of a simply connected covering $\widetilde{G}$ of G; in other words, G fits into the central extension

$$1 \to \pi_1(G) \to \widetilde{G} \overset{p}\to G \to 1.$$

Equivalently, given a Lie algebra $\mathfrak{g}$ and a simply connected Lie group $\widetilde{G}$ whose Lie algebra is $\mathfrak{g}$, there is a one-to-one correspondence between quotients of $\widetilde{G}$ by discrete central subgroups and connected Lie groups having Lie algebra $\mathfrak{g}$.

For the complex case, complex tori are important; see complex Lie group for this topic.

== Compact Lie groups ==
Let G be a connected Lie group with finite center. Then the following are equivalent.

- G is compact.
- (Weyl) The simply connected covering $\widetilde{G}$ of G is compact.
- The adjoint group $\operatorname{Int}\mathfrak{g}$ is compact.
- There exists an embedding $G \hookrightarrow O(n, \mathbb{R})$ as a closed subgroup.
- The Killing form on $\mathfrak{g}$ is negative definite.
- For each X in $\mathfrak{g}$, $\operatorname{ad}(X)$ is diagonalizable and has zero or purely imaginary eigenvalues.
- There exists an invariant inner product on $\mathfrak{g}$.

It is important to emphasize that the equivalence of the preceding conditions holds only under the assumption that G has finite center. Thus, for example, if G is compact with finite center, the universal cover $\widetilde{G}$ is also compact. Clearly, this conclusion does not hold if G has infinite center, e.g., if $G=S^1$. The last three conditions above are purely Lie algebraic in nature.

| Compact Lie group | Complexification of associated Lie algebra | Root system |
|---|---|---|
| SU(n+1) $= \left\{ A \in M_{n+1}(\mathbb{C}) \mid {\overline{A}}^{\mathrm{T}} A = I, \det(A) = 1 \right\}$ | $\mathfrak{sl}(n+1, \mathbb{C})$ $= \{ X \in M_{n+1}(\mathbb{C}) \mid \operatorname{tr} X = 0 \}$ | A_{n} |
| SO(2n+1) $= \left\{ A \in M_{2n+1}(\mathbb{R}) \mid A^{\mathrm{T}} A = I, \det(A) = 1 \right\}$ | $\mathfrak{so}(2n+1, \mathbb{C})$ $= \left\{ X \in M_{2n+1}(\mathbb{C}) \mid X^{\mathrm{T}} + X = 0 \right\}$ | B_{n} |
| Sp(n) $$= \left\{ A \in U(2n) \mid A^{\mathrm{T}} J A = J \right\}, \, J = \begin{bmatrix} 0 & I_n \\ - I_n & 0\end{bmatrix}$$ | $\mathfrak{sp}(n, \mathbb{C})$ $= \left\{ X \in M_{2n}(\mathbb{C}) \mid X^{\mathrm{T}} J + JX = 0 \right\}$ | C_{n} |
| SO(2n) $= \left\{ A \in M_{2n}(\mathbb{R}) \mid A^{\mathrm{T}} A = I, \det(A) = 1 \right\}$ | $\mathfrak{so}(2n, \mathbb{C})$ $= \left\{ X \in M_{2n}(\mathbb{C}) \mid X^{\mathrm{T}} + X = 0 \right\}$ | D_{n} |

If G is a compact Lie group, then

$$H^k(\mathfrak{g}; \mathbb{R}) = H_{\text{dR}}(G)$$

where the left-hand side is the Lie algebra cohomology of $\mathfrak{g}$ and the right-hand side is the de Rham cohomology of G. (Roughly, this is a consequence of the fact that any differential form on G can be made left invariant by the averaging argument.)

== Related constructions ==
Let G be a Lie group. The associated Lie algebra $\operatorname{Lie}(G)$ of G may be alternatively defined as follows. Let $A(G)$ be the algebra of distributions on G with support at the identity element with the multiplication given by convolution. $A(G)$ is in fact a Hopf algebra. The Lie algebra of G is then $\mathfrak{g} = \operatorname{Lie}(G) = P(A(G))$, the Lie algebra of primitive elements in $A(G)$. By the Milnor–Moore theorem, there is the canonical isomorphism $U(\mathfrak{g}) = A(G)$ between the universal enveloping algebra of $\mathfrak{g}$ and $A(G)$.

== See also ==
- Compact Lie algebra
- Milnor–Moore theorem
- Formal group
- Malcev Lie algebra
- Distribution on a linear algebraic group
