= Cylindric numbering =

Special kind of numbering first introduced by Yuri L. Ershov in 1973

In computability theory a cylindric numbering is a special kind of numbering first introduced by Yuri L. Ershov in 1973.

If a numbering $\nu$ is reducible to $\mu$ then there exists a computable function $f$ with $\nu = \mu \circ f$. Usually $f$ is not injective, but if $\mu$ is a cylindric numbering we can always find an injective $f$.

== Definition ==
A numbering $\nu$ is called cylindric if

$$\nu \equiv_1 c(\nu).$$

That is if it is one-equivalent to its cylindrification

A set $S$ is called cylindric if its indicator function

$$1_S: \mathbb{N} \to \{0,1\}$$

is a cylindric numbering.

== Examples ==
- Every Gödel numbering is cylindric

== Properties ==
- Cylindric numberings are idempotent: $\nu \circ \nu = \nu$
