= Anatoly Maltsev =

Russian mathematician (1909–1967)

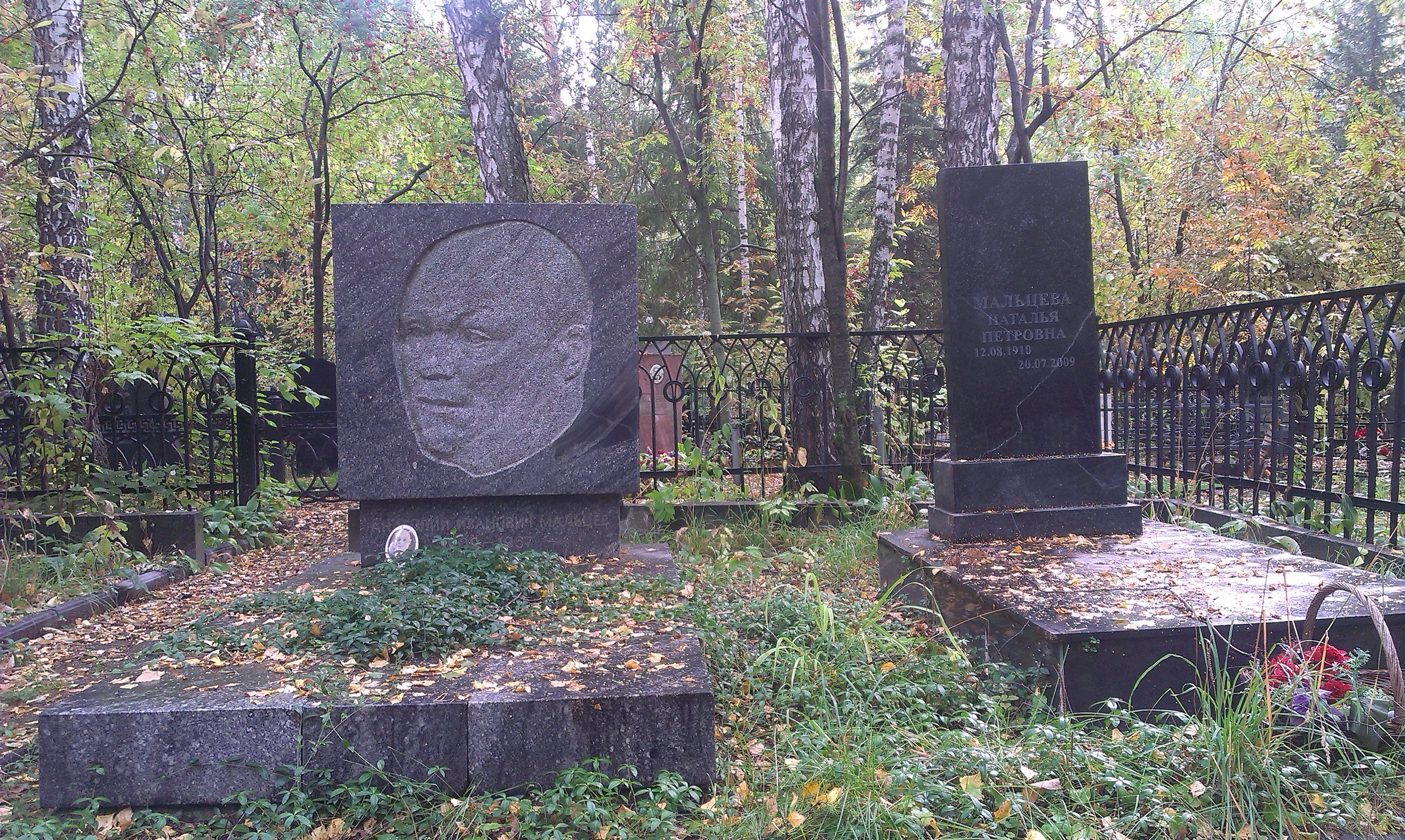
The grave of A. I. and N. P. Maltsev in Southern (Cherbuzinskoye) Cemetery

Anatoly Ivanovich Maltsev (also: Malcev, Mal'cev; Russian: Анато́лий Ива́нович Ма́льцев; 27 November N.S./14 November O.S. 1909, Moscow Governorate – 7 June 1967, Novosibirsk) was born in Misheronsky, near Moscow, and died in Novosibirsk, USSR. He was a mathematician noted for his work on the decidability of various algebraic groups. Malcev algebras (generalisations of Lie algebras), as well as Malcev Lie algebras are named after him.

== Biography ==
At school, Maltsev demonstrated an aptitude for mathematics, and when he left school in 1927, he went to Moscow State University to study Mathematics. While he was there, he started teaching in a secondary school in Moscow. After graduating in 1931, he continued his teaching career and in 1932 was appointed as an assistant at the Ivanovo Pedagogical Institute located in Ivanovo, near Moscow.

Whilst teaching at Ivanovo, Maltsev made frequent trips to Moscow to discuss his research with Kolmogorov. Maltsev's first publications were on logic and model theory. Kolmogorov soon invited him to join his graduate programme at Moscow State University, and, maintaining his post at Ivanovo, Maltsev effectively became Kolmogorov's student.

In 1937, Maltsev published a paper on the embedding of a ring in a field. Two years later, he published a second paper where he gave necessary and sufficient conditions for a semigroup to be embeddable in a group.

Between 1939 and 1941, he studied for his doctorate at the Steklov Institute of the USSR Academy of Sciences, with a dissertation on the Structure of isomorphic representable infinite algebras and groups.

In 1944, Maltsev became a professor at the Ivanovo Pedagogical Institute where he continued to work on group theory and linear groups in particular. He also studied Lie groups and topological algebras. He generalized the Lie group–Lie algebra correspondence; his generalization is now known as the Mal'cev correspondence.

Malcev proved that there is a category isomorphism between the category of torsion-free radicable nilpotent groups of finite rank and the category of nilpotent finite-dimensional rational Lie algebras. One can view this isomorphism as being given by the Campbell–Baker–Hausdorff formula. This point of view is carried further by Lazard and Stewart.

In 1958, Maltsev became an Academician of the Soviet Academy of Sciences. In 1960, he was appointed to a chair in mathematics at the Mathematics Institute at Novosibirsk and chaired the Algebra and Logic Department of Novosibirsk State University. He founded the Siberian section of the Mathematics Institute of the Academy of Sciences, the Siberian Mathematical Society and the journal Algebra i Logika. Maltsev also founded the "Algebra and Logic Seminar" attended by his students Igor Lavrov, Larisa Maksimova, Dmitry Smirnov, Mikhail Taitslin, and A. Vinogradov, as well as by Yuri Ershov and others. This seminar, in essence, started a new school in model theory and decidability of elementary theories.

During the early 1960s, Maltsev worked on problems of decidability of elementary theories of various algebraic structures. He showed the undecidability of the elementary theory of finite groups, of free nilpotent groups, of free soluble groups and many others. He also proved that the class of locally free algebras has a decidable theory.

Maltsev received many honours, including the Stalin Prize in 1946 and Lenin Prize in 1964. In 1962 he founded the mathematical journal Algebra i Logika.

== Selected publications ==
- Algebraic Systems by A.I. Mal'cev, Springer-Verlag, 1973, ISBN 0-387-05792-7
- The metamathematics of algebraic systems, collected papers: 1936-1967 by A.I. Mal'cev, Amsterdam, North-Holland Pub. Co., 1971, ISBN 0-7204-2266-3 (xvii+494 p.; trans., ed. and provided with additional notes by Benjamin Franklin Wells, III)
- Algorithms and recursive functions by A. I. Mal'cev, Groningen, Wolters-Noordhoff Pub. Co. 1970
- Foundations of linear algebra by A. I. Mal'cev, San Francisco, W.H. Freeman, 1963 (xi+304 p. illus.; trans. by Thomas Craig Brown; ed. by J. B. Roberts)

== See also ==
- Hahn–Mal'cev–Neumann series
- Malcev algebra
- Mal'cev's criterion
- Malcev Lie algebra
- Malcev-admissible algebra
