= Cylindrification =

Concept in computability theory, a field of mathematics

In computability theory a cylindrification is a construction that associates a cylindric numbering to each numbering. The concept was first introduced by Yuri L. Ershov in 1973.

== Definition ==
Given a numbering $\nu$, the cylindrification $c(\nu)$ is defined as

$$\mathrm{Domain}(c(\nu)) := \{\langle n, k \rangle | n \in \mathrm{Domain}(\nu)\}$$
$$c(\nu)\langle n, k \rangle := \nu(n)$$

where $\langle n, k \rangle$ is the Cantor pairing function.

Note that the cylindrification operation increases the input arity by 1.

== Properties ==
- Given two numberings $\nu$ and $\mu$ then $\nu \le \mu \Leftrightarrow c(\nu) \le_1 c(\mu)$
- $\nu \le_1 c(\nu)$
