= Recursion theorem =

Recursion theorem can refer to:

- The recursion theorem in set theory
- Kleene's recursion theorem, also called the fixed point theorem, in computability theory
- The master theorem (analysis of algorithms), about the complexity of divide-and-conquer algorithms
