= Diagonalization =

In logic and mathematics, diagonalization may refer to:

- Matrix diagonalization, a construction of a diagonal matrix (with nonzero entries only on the main diagonal) that is similar to a given matrix
- Diagonal argument (disambiguation), various closely related proof techniques, including:
  - Cantor's diagonal argument, used to prove that the set of real numbers is not countable
  - Diagonal lemma, used to create self-referential sentences in formal logic
- Table diagonalization, a form of data reduction used to make interpretation of tables and charts easier.
