= Larisa Maksimova =

Russian mathematical logician (1943–2025)

Larisa Lvovna Maksimova (Russian: Лариса Львовна Максимова; 5 November 1943 – 4 April 2025) was a Russian mathematical logician known for her research in non-classical logic.

== Life and career ==
Maksimova was born on 5 November 1943, in Kochenyovo, the daughter of two biologists who had temporarily moved there from Tomsk State University to escape the war. She grew up in Novosibirsk, where her parents became geographers at the Novosibirsk Pedagogical Institute. She studied mechanics and mathematics at Novosibirsk State University, publishing her first paper on Wilhelm Ackermann's axioms for strict implication in relevance logic in 1964 and graduating in 1965.

Meanwhile, in 1964, she joined the Sobolev Institute of Mathematics, and remained there for the rest of her career. She defended her doctorate at Novosibirsk State University in 1968, a year after the death of her primary mentor at the university, Anatoly Maltsev. She completed a habilitation at the Sobolev Institute in 1986, and was promoted to full professor in 1993. She died on 4 April 2025, at the age of 81.

== Recognition ==
Maksimova won the Maltsev Prize of the Russian Academy of Sciences in 2009, for her papers on definability and interpolation in non-classical logic. With several others from the Sobolev Institute, she won the Russian Federation Government Prize in Education in 2010. She is the subject of a festschrift, Larisa Maksimova on Implication, Interpolation, and Definability (Sergei Odintsov, ed., Springer, 2018).

== Books ==
Maksimova's books include

- Problems in Set Theory, Mathematical Logic and the Theory of Algorithms (with Igor Lavrov, Izdat Nauka, 1975, 1984, and 1995; translated into English by Valentin Shehtman, Kluwer, 2003)
- Interpolation and Definability: Modal and Intuitionistic Logics (with Dov Gabbay, Clarendon Press, 2005)
