= Quine's paradox =

Logical paradox concerning truth values

Quine's paradox is a paradox concerning truth values, stated by Willard Van Orman Quine. It is related to the liar paradox as a problem, and it purports to show that a sentence can be paradoxical even if it is not self-referring and does not use demonstratives or indexicals (i.e. it does not explicitly refer to itself). The paradox can be expressed as follows:

"yields falsehood when preceded by its quotation" yields falsehood when preceded by its quotation.

If the paradox is not clear, consider each part of the above description of the paradox incrementally:

it = yields falsehood when preceded by its quotation
its quotation = "yields falsehood when preceded by its quotation"
it preceded by its quotation = "yields falsehood when preceded by its quotation" yields falsehood when preceded by its quotation.

With these tools, the description of the paradox may now be reconsidered; it can be seen to assert the following:

The statement "'yields falsehood when preceded by its quotation' yields falsehood when preceded by its quotation" is false.

In other words, the sentence implies that it is false, which is paradoxical—for if it is false, what it states is in fact true.

== Motivation ==
The liar paradox ("This sentence is false", or "The next sentence is true. The previous sentence is false") demonstrates essential difficulties in assigning a truth value even to simple sentences. Many philosophers attempting to explain the liar paradox – for examples see that article – concluded that the problem was with the use of demonstrative word "this" or its replacements. Once we properly analyze this sort of self-reference, according to those philosophers, the paradox no longer arises.

Quine's construction demonstrates that paradox of this kind arises independently of such direct self-reference, for, no lexeme of the sentence refers to the sentence, though Quine's sentence does contain a lexeme which refers to one of its parts. Namely, "its" near the end of the sentence is a possessive pronoun whose antecedent is the very predicate in which it occurs. Thus, although Quine's sentence per se is not self-referring, it does contain a self-referring predicate.

== Application ==
Quine suggested an unnatural linguistic resolution to such logical antinomies, inspired by Bertrand Russell's type theory and Tarski's work. His system would attach levels to a line of problematic expressions such as falsehood and denote. Entire sentences would stand higher in the hierarchy than their parts. The form "'Clause about falsehood_{0}' yields falsehood_{1}" will be grammatically correct, and "'Denoting_{0} phrase' denotes_{0} itself" – wrong.

George Boolos, inspired by his student Michael Ernst, has written that the sentence might be syntactically ambiguous, in using multiple quotation marks whose exact mate marks cannot be determined. He revised traditional quotation into a system where the length of outer pairs of so-called q-marks of an expression is determined by the q-marks that appear inside the expression. This accounts not only for ordered quotes-within-quotes but also to, say, strings with an odd number of quotation marks.

In Gödel, Escher, Bach: An Eternal Golden Braid, author Douglas Hofstadter suggests that the Quine sentence in fact uses an indirect type of self-reference. He then shows that indirect self-reference is crucial in many of the proofs of Gödel's incompleteness theorems.

== See also ==
- Grelling paradox
- List of paradoxes
- Quine (computing), a computer program that produces its source code as output
- Russell paradox
- Self-reference
- Yablo's paradox
