= Diagonal argument =

A diagonal argument, in mathematics, is a technique employed in proofs. The following theorems are notable examples:

- Cantor's diagonal argument (the earliest)
- Cantor's theorem
- Russell's paradox
- Curry's paradox
- Diagonal lemma
  - Gödel's first incompleteness theorem
  - Tarski's undefinability theorem
- Halting problem
- Kleene's recursion theorem
- Lawvere's fixed-point theorem (categorical generalization of all of the above)

== See also ==
- Diagonalization (disambiguation)
