= Algebra i Logika =

- Discipline: Mathematics
- Language: Russian, English
- Edited by: Yury Leonidovich Ershov

Publication details
- History: 1962–present
- Publisher: Siberian Fund for Algebra and Logic (Russia)
- Frequency: Bimonthly
- Impact factor: 0.753 (2020)

Standard abbreviations
- ISO 4: Algebra Log.
- MathSciNet: Algebra Logika

Indexing
- ISSN: 0373-9252

Links
- Journal homepage; Online access

Algebra i Logika (English: Algebra and Logic) is a peer-reviewed Russian mathematical journal founded in 1962 by Anatoly Ivanovich Malcev, published by the Siberian Fund for Algebra and Logic at Novosibirsk State University. An English translation of the journal is published by Springer-Verlag as Algebra and Logic since 1968. It published papers presented at the meetings of the "Algebra and Logic" seminar at the Novosibirsk State University. The journal is edited by academician Yury Yershov.

The journal is reviewed cover-to-cover in Mathematical Reviews and Zentralblatt MATH.

== Abstracting and Indexing ==
Algebra i Logika is indexed and abstracted in the following databases:

- Academic OneFile
- Academic Search
- EBSCO
- Inspec
- International Bibliography of Book Reviews
- International Bibliography of Periodical Literature
- Journal Citation Reports/Science Edition
- Mathematical Reviews
- Science Citation Index
- SCImago
- Scopus
- STMA-Z
- Summon by Serial Solutions
- Zentralblatt Math

According to the Journal Citation Reports, the journal had a 2020 impact factor of 0.753.
