= Milnor–Moore theorem =

Algebraic theorem

In algebra, the Milnor–Moore theorem, introduced by John W. Milnor and John C. Moore (1965) classifies an important class of Hopf algebras, of the sort that often show up as cohomology rings in algebraic topology.

The theorem states: given a connected, graded, cocommutative Hopf algebra A over a field of characteristic zero with $\dim A_n < \infty$ for all n, the natural Hopf algebra homomorphism

$$U(P(A)) \to A$$

from the universal enveloping algebra of the graded Lie algebra $P(A)$ of primitive elements of A to A is an isomorphism. Here we say A is connected if $A_0$ is the field and $A_n = 0$ for negative n. The universal enveloping algebra of a graded Lie algebra L is the quotient of the tensor algebra of L by the two-sided ideal generated by all elements of the form $xy- (-1)^{|x||y|}yx - [x,y]$.

In algebraic topology, the term usually refers to the corollary of the aforementioned result, that for a pointed, simply connected space X, the following isomorphism holds:

$$U(\pi_{\ast}(\Omega X) \otimes \Q) \cong H_{\ast}(\Omega X;\Q),$$

where $\Omega X$ denotes the loop space of X, compare with Theorem 21.5 from Félix, Halperin & Thomas (2001). This work may also be compared with that of (Halpern 1958a, 1958b). Here the multiplication on the right hand side induced by the product $\Omega X \times \Omega X \rightarrow \Omega X$, and then by the Eilenberg-Zilber multiplication $C_*(\Omega X) \times C_*(\Omega X) \rightarrow C_*(\Omega X)$.

On the left hand side, since $X$ is simply connected, $\pi_{\ast}(\Omega X) \otimes \Q$ is a $\Q$-vector space; the notation $U(V)$ stands for the universal enveloping algebra.
