= Malcev Lie algebra =

In mathematics, a Malcev Lie algebra, or Mal'tsev Lie algebra, is a generalization of a rational nilpotent Lie algebra, and Malcev groups are similar. Both were introduced by Quillen (1969, Appendix A3), based on the work of (Mal'cev 1949).

== Definition ==
According to Papadima & Suciu (2004) a Malcev Lie algebra is a rational Lie algebra $L$ together with a complete, descending ${\mathbb Q}$-vector space filtration $\{F_r L\}_{r\ge 1}$, such that:

- $F_1 L = L$
- $[F_rL, F_sL]\subset F_{r+s}L$
- the associated graded Lie algebra $\oplus_{r\ge 1} F_rL/F_{r+1}L$ is generated by elements of degree one.

== Applications ==
=== Relation to Hopf algebras ===
Quillen (1969, Appendix A3) showed that Malcev Lie algebras and Malcev groups are both equivalent to complete Hopf algebras, i.e., Hopf algebras H endowed with a filtration so that H is isomorphic to $\varprojlim H / F_n H$. The functors involved in these equivalences are as follows: a Malcev group G is mapped to the completion (with respect to the augmentation ideal) of its group ring QG, with inverse given by the group of grouplike elements of a Hopf algebra H, essentially those elements 1 + x such that $\Delta (x) = x \otimes x$. From complete Hopf algebras to Malcev Lie algebras one gets by taking the (completion of) primitive elements, with inverse functor given by the completion of the universal enveloping algebra.

This equivalence of categories was used by Goodwillie (1986) to prove that, after tensoring with Q, relative K-theory K(A, I), for a nilpotent ideal I, is isomorphic to relative cyclic homology HC(A, I). This theorem was a pioneering result in the area of trace methods.

=== Hodge theory ===
Malcev Lie algebras also arise in the theory of mixed Hodge structures.
