= Table diagonalization =

Diagonalization is the process of re-ordering the rows and columns of tables and charts so that the data forms an approximately diagonal line. This makes it easier for people to see patterns in the data.

Columns and rows are moved around until a diagonal pattern appears, thereby making it easy to see patterns in the data.

Diagonalization typically involves either raw data, percentages, means or residuals.

Generally once tables are diagonalized one of two patterns appears: hierarchy or segmentation.
