= Medvedev reducibility =

Concept in computability theory

In computability theory, a set $P$ of functions $\mathbb{N} \rarr \mathbb{N}$ is said to be Medvedev-reducible to another set $Q$ of functions $\mathbb{N} \rarr \mathbb{N}$ when there exists an oracle Turing machine that computes some function in $P$ whenever it is given some function from $Q$ as an oracle.

Medvedev reducibility is a uniform variant of Mučnik reducibility, requiring a single oracle machine that can compute some function of $P$ given any oracle from $Q$, instead of a family of oracle machines, one per oracle from $Q$, that compute functions from $P$.

== See also ==
- Mučnik reducibility
- Turing reducibility
- Reduction (computability)
