= Henry Gordon Rice =

American mathematician (1920–2003)

Henry Gordon Rice (July 20, 1920 – April 14, 2003) was an American logician and mathematician best known as the author of Rice's theorem, which he proved in his doctoral dissertation of 1951 at Syracuse University with thesis advisor Paul C. Rosenbloom. Rice was also a Professor of Mathematics at the University of New Hampshire. After 1960 he was employed by Computer Sciences Corporation in El Segundo.

Rice died on April 14, 2003, in Davis, California.
