= Friedberg numbering =

In computability theory, a Friedberg numbering is a computable numbering (enumeration) of the set of all computably enumerable sets that has no repetitions: each computably enumerable set appears exactly once in the enumeration (Vereščagin and Shen 2003:30).

The existence of such numberings was established by Richard M. Friedberg in 1958 (Cutland 1980:78).
