= Index set (computability) =

Classes of partial recursive functions

In computability theory, index sets describe classes of computable functions; specifically, they give all indices of functions in a certain class, according to a fixed Gödel numbering of partial computable functions.

== Definition ==
Let $\varphi_e$ be a computable enumeration of all partial computable functions, and $W_{e}$ be a computable enumeration of all c.e. sets.

Let $\mathcal{A}$ be a class of partial computable functions. If $A = \{x \,:\, \varphi_{x} \in \mathcal{A} \}$ then $A$ is the index set of $\mathcal{A}$. In general $A$ is an index set if for every $x,y \in \mathbb{N}$ with $\varphi_x \simeq \varphi_y$ (i.e. they index the same function), we have $x \in A \leftrightarrow y \in A$. Intuitively, these are the sets of natural numbers that we describe only with reference to the functions they index.

== Index sets and Rice's theorem ==
Most index sets are non-computable, aside from two trivial exceptions. This is stated in Rice's theorem:

Let $\mathcal{C}$ be a class of partial computable functions with its index set $C$. Then $C$ is computable if and only if $C$ is empty, or $C$ is all of $\mathbb{N}$.

Rice's theorem says "any nontrivial property of partial computable functions is undecidable".

== Completeness in the arithmetical hierarchy ==
Index sets provide many examples of sets which are complete at some level of the arithmetical hierarchy. Here, we say a $\Sigma_n$ set $A$ is $\Sigma_n$-complete if, for every $\Sigma_n$ set $B$, there is an m-reduction from $B$ to $A$. $\Pi_n$-completeness is defined similarly. Here are some examples:

- $\mathrm{Emp} = \{ e \,:\, W_e = \varnothing \}$ is $\Pi_1$-complete.
- $\mathrm{Fin} = \{ e \,:\, W_e \text{ is finite} \}$ is $\Sigma_2$-complete.
- $\mathrm{Inf} = \{ e \,:\, W_e \text{ is infinite} \}$ is $\Pi_2$-complete.
- $\mathrm{Tot} = \{ e \,:\, \varphi_e \text{ is total} \} = \{ e : W_e = \mathbb{N} \}$ is $\Pi_2$-complete.
- $\mathrm{Con} = \{ e \,:\, \varphi_e \text{ is total and constant} \}$ is $\Pi_2$-complete.
- $\mathrm{Cof} = \{ e \,:\, W_e \text{ is cofinite} \}$ is $\Sigma_3$-complete.
- $\mathrm{Rec} = \{ e \,:\, W_e \text{ is computable} \}$ is $\Sigma_3$-complete.
- $\mathrm{Ext} = \{ e \,:\, \varphi_e \text{ is extendible to a total computable function} \}$ is $\Sigma_3$-complete.
- $\mathrm{Cpl} = \{ e \,:\, W_e \equiv_\mathrm{T} \mathrm{HP} \}$ is $\Sigma_4$-complete, where $\mathrm{HP}$ is the halting problem.

Empirically, if the "most obvious" definition of a set $A$ is $\Sigma_n$ [resp. $\Pi_n$], we can usually show that $A$ is $\Sigma_n$-complete [resp. $\Pi_n$-complete].
