= Smn theorem =

On transforming a program by substituting constants for free variables

In computability theory the S m
n theorem, written also as "smn-theorem" or "s-m-n theorem" (also called the translation lemma, parameter theorem, and the parameterization theorem) is a basic result about programming languages (and, more generally, Gödel numberings of the partial computable functions). It was first proved by Stephen Cole Kleene (1938). (Note: Kleene (1938). This is the reference given in Odifreddi 1999, p. 131, Proposition 11.1.7 — $S^m_n$ Theorem) The name $S^m_n$ comes from the occurrence of an $S$ with subscript $n$ and superscript $m$ in the original formulation of the theorem (see below).

In practical terms, the theorem says that for a given programming language and positive integers $m$ and $n$, there exists a particular algorithm that accepts as input the source code of a program with $m + n$ free variables, together with $m$ values. This algorithm generates source code that in essence substitutes the values for the first $m$ free variables, leaving the rest of the variables free.

== Details ==
The basic form of the theorem applies to functions of two arguments. Given a Gödel numbering $\varphi$ of partial computable functions, there is a primitive recursive function $s$ of two arguments with the following property: for every Gödel number $e$ of a partial computable function $f$ with two arguments, the expressions $\varphi_{s(e, x)}(y)$ and $f(x, y)$ are defined for the same combinations of natural numbers $x$ and $y$, and their values are equal for any such combination. In other words, the following extensional equality of functions holds for every $x$:

$$\varphi_{s(e, x)} \simeq \lambda y.\varphi_e(x, y).$$

More generally, for any $m, n > 0$, there exists a primitive recursive function $S^m_n$ of $m + 1$ arguments that behaves as follows: for every Gödel number $e$ of a partial computable function with $m + n$ arguments, and all values of $x_1, x_2, ..., x_m$:

$$\varphi_{S^m_n(e, x_1, \dots, x_m)} \simeq \lambda y_1, \dots, y_n.\varphi_e(x_1, \dots, x_m, y_1, \dots, y_n).$$

The function $s$ described above can be taken to be $S^1_1$.

== Formal statement ==
Given arities $m$ and $n$, for every Turing machine $\text{TM}_x$ of arity $m + n$ and for all possible values of inputs $y_1, \dots, y_m$, there exists a Turing machine $\text{TM}_k$ of arity $n$, such that

$$\forall z_1, \dots, z_n : \text{TM}_x(y_1, \dots, y_m, z_1, \dots, z_n) = \text{TM}_k(z_1, \dots, z_n).$$

Furthermore, there is a Turing machine $S$ that allows $k$ to be calculated from $x$ and $y$; it is denoted $k = S_n^m(x, y_1, \dots, y_m)$.

Informally, $S$ finds the Turing Machine $\text{TM}_k$ that is the result of hardcoding the values of $y$ into $\text{TM}_x$. The result generalizes to any Turing-complete computing model.

== Example ==
The following Lisp code implements s_{11} for Lisp.

(defun s11 (f x)
  (let ((y (gensym)))
    (list 'lambda (list y) (list f x y))))

For example, (s11 '(lambda (x y) (+ x y)) 3) evaluates to (lambda (g42) ((lambda (x y) (+ x y)) 3 g42)), where g42 is a "fresh" symbol.

== See also ==
- Currying
- Kleene's recursion theorem
- Partial evaluation
