= Yury Yershov =

Russian mathematician

- Юрий Ершов
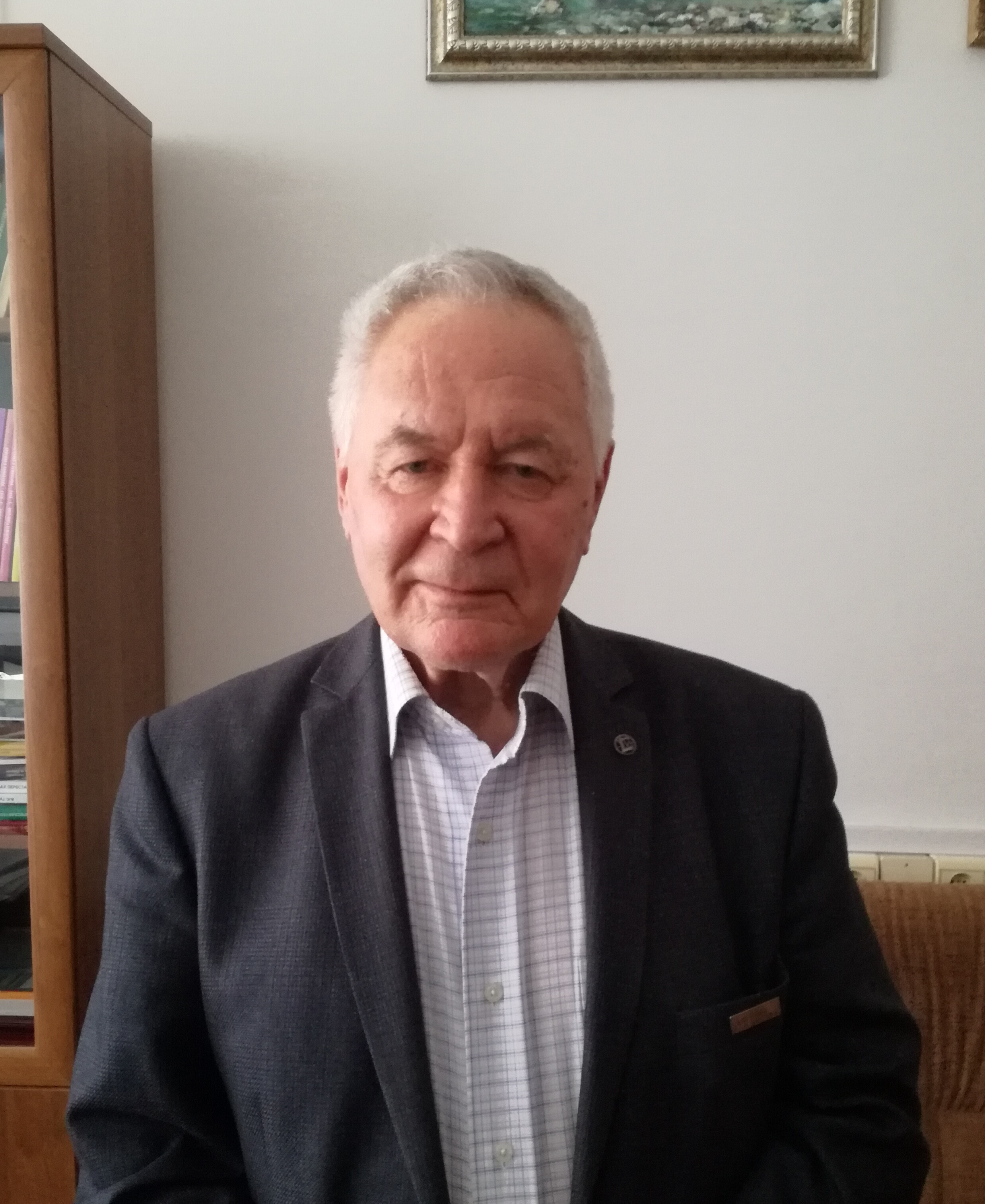
- Yershov in 2017
- Born: Yury Leonidovich Yershov; 1 May 1940 (age 86); Novosibirsk, Soviet Union
- Education: Novosibirsk State University
- Scientific career
- Fields: Mathematics

Yury Leonidovich Yershov (Russian: Ю́рий Леони́дович Ершо́в, born 1 May 1940 ) is a Soviet and Russian mathematician.

Yury Yershov was born in 1940 in Novosibirsk. In 1958 he entered the Tomsk State University and in 1963 graduated from the Mathematical Department of the Novosibirsk State University. In 1964 he successfully defended his PhD thesis "Decidable and Undecidable Theories" (advisor Anatoly Maltsev). In 1966 he successfully defended his DrSc thesis "Elementary Theory of Fields" (Элементарные теория полей).

Apart from being a mathematician, Yershov was a member of the Communist Party and had different distinguished administrative duties in Novosibirsk State University. Yershov has been accused of antisemitic practices, and his visit to the U.S. in 1980 drew public protests by a number of U.S. mathematicians. Yershov himself denied the validity of these accusations.

Yury Yershov is a member of the Russian Academy of Sciences, professor emeritus of Novosibirsk State University and a former Rector of the Novosibirsk State University.

He has been working at the Sobolev Institute of Mathematics since 1963. Currently he is Director of this Institute (since 2003). In 1968 he received the title of Full Professor. In 1970 he was elected to be a Correspondent Member of the Academy of Sciences of the USSR, in 1990 he became Full Member (Academician) of the Russian Academy of Sciences. In 1964–2002 he worked at the Novosibirsk State University (as second job): in 1968–2002 as a professor, in addition, in 1973–1976 he was dean of the Mathematical Department of the Novosibirsk State University and rector of this university in 1985–1993. He is editor in chief of the Siberian Mathematical Journal and editor in chief of the journal Algebra i Logika (Algebra and Logic).

His basic scientific interests are: algebra, field theory, mathematical logic, algorithm theory, model theory, constructive models, computer science and philosophical aspects of mathematics. He proved decidability of the elementary theory of the field of p-adic numbers (independently proven by J. Ax and S. Kochen), undecidability of the elementary theory of finite symmetric groups, decidability of the elementary theory of relatively complemented distributive lattices.

Yury Yershov is a laureate of Maltsev's Award of the Russian Academy of Sciences (1992), Russian State Award in the area of Science and Technics (2002, 2003), Lavrentyev's Foundation Award (2007), and is decorated with several Russian State Orders. In 2013 he won the Demidov Prize. In 2023 he was awarded the Lobachevsky Prize.

He was an invited speaker at the International Congress of Mathematicians in 1966 at Moscow with the talk Elementary theories of fields and in 1970 at Nice with the talk La theorie des enumerations.

== Selected works ==
- Yershov, Yury (1996). Definability and Computability. Springer. ISBN 9780306110399.
- Yershov, Yury (2001). Multi-Valued Fields. Springer. ISBN 9780306110689.
- Yershov, Yury (2004). "Local class field theory". St. Petersburg Math. J. 15 (6): 837–846. doi:10.1090/S1061-0022-04-00834-9. MR 2044630.
- Yershov, Yury (2008). "Tame and purely wild extensions of valued fields". St. Petersburg Math. J. 19 (5): 765–773. doi:10.1090/S1061-0022-08-01019-4. MR 2381943.
