= Interesting number paradox =

On the smallest non-interesting number

The interesting number paradox is a humorous paradox which arises from the attempt to classify every natural number as either "interesting" or "uninteresting". The paradox states that every natural number is interesting. The "proof" is by contradiction: if there exists a non-empty set of uninteresting natural numbers, there would be a smallest uninteresting number – but the smallest uninteresting number is itself interesting because it is the smallest uninteresting number, thus producing a contradiction.

Famously, in a discussion between the mathematicians G. H. Hardy and Srinivasa Ramanujan about interesting and uninteresting numbers, Hardy remarked that the number 1729 of the taxicab he had ridden seemed "rather a dull one", and Ramanujan immediately answered that it is interesting, being the smallest number that is the sum of two cubes in two different ways.

== Paradoxical nature ==
Attempting to classify all numbers this way leads to a paradox or an antinomy of definition. Any hypothetical partition of natural numbers into interesting and uninteresting sets seems to fail. Since the definition of interesting is usually a subjective, intuitive notion, it should be understood as a semi-humorous application of self-reference in order to obtain a paradox.

The paradox is alleviated if "interesting" is instead defined objectively: for example, in 2023, the smallest natural number that did not appear in an entry of the On-Line Encyclopedia of Integer Sequences (OEIS) was 20,067. This definition of uninteresting is possible only because the OEIS lists only a finite number of terms for each entry. Otherwise, every positive integer would be interesting, because OEIS: A000027 is the sequence of all positive integers. Depending on the sources used for the list of interesting numbers, a variety of other numbers can be characterized as uninteresting in the same way. For instance, the mathematician and philosopher Alex Bellos suggested in 2014 that a candidate for the lowest uninteresting number would be 224 because it was, at the time, "the lowest number not to have its own page on [the English-language version of] Wikipedia".

However, as there are many significant results in mathematics that make use of self-reference (such as Gödel's incompleteness theorems), the paradox illustrates some of the power of self-reference, (Note: See, for example, Gödel, Escher, Bach#Themes, which itself—like this section of this article—also mentions and contains a wikilink to self-reference.) and thus touches on serious issues in many fields of study. The paradox can be related directly to Gödel's incompleteness theorems if one defines an "interesting" number as one that can be computed by a program that contains fewer bits than the number itself. Similarly, instead of trying to quantify the subjective feeling of interestingness, one can consider the length of a phrase needed to specify a number. For example, the phrase "the least number not expressible in fewer than eleven words" sounds like it should identify a unique number, but the phrase itself contains only ten words, and so the number identified by the phrase would have an expression in fewer than eleven words after all. This is known as the Berry paradox.

== History ==
In 1945, Edwin F. Beckenbach published a short letter in The American Mathematical Monthly suggesting that

One might conjecture that there is an interesting fact concerning each of the positive integers. Here is a "proof by induction" that such is the case. Certainly, 1, which is a factor of each positive integer, qualifies, as do 2, the smallest prime; 3, the smallest odd prime; 4, Bieberbach's number; etc. Suppose the set S of positive integers concerning each of which there is no interesting fact is not vacuous, and let k be the smallest member of S. But this is a most interesting fact concerning k! Hence S has no smallest member and therefore is vacuous. Is the proof valid?

Constance Reid included the paradox in the 1955 first edition of her popular mathematics book From Zero to Infinity, but removed it from later editions. Martin Gardner presented the paradox as a "fallacy" in his Scientific American column in 1958, including it with six other "astonishing assertions" whose purported proofs were also subtly erroneous. A 1980 letter to The Mathematics Teacher mentions a jocular proof that "all natural numbers are interesting" having been discussed three decades earlier. In 1977, Greg Chaitin referred to Gardner's statement of the paradox and pointed out its relation to an earlier paradox of Bertrand Russell on the existence of a smallest undefinable ordinal (despite the fact that all sets of ordinals have a smallest element and that "the smallest undefinable ordinal" would appear to be a definition).

In The Penguin Dictionary of Curious and Interesting Numbers (1987), David Wells commented that 39 "appears to be the first uninteresting number", a fact that made it "especially interesting", and thus 39 must be simultaneously interesting and dull.

== See also ==
- Church–Turing thesis
- Berry Paradox
- Richard's Paradox
- List of paradoxes
- 304, smallest number without an article on Wikipedia.
