= From Zero to Infinity =

1955 mathematics book by Constance Reid

From Zero to Infinity: What Makes Numbers Interesting
- Author: Constance Reid
- Language: English
- Publisher: Thomas Y. Crowell Company
- Publication date: 1955
- OCLC: 1240198
- LC Class: QA21 .R4

From Zero to Infinity: What Makes Numbers Interesting is a book in popular mathematics and number theory by Constance Reid. It was originally published in 1955 by the Thomas Y. Crowell Company. The fourth edition was published in 1992 by the Mathematical Association of America in their MAA Spectrum series. A K Peters published a fifth "Fiftieth anniversary edition" in 2006.

== Background ==
Reid was not herself a professional mathematician, but came from a mathematical family that included her sister Julia Robinson and brother-in-law Raphael M. Robinson. She had worked as a schoolteacher, but by the time of the publication of From Zero to Infinity she was a "housewife and free-lance writer". She became known for her many books about mathematics and mathematicians, aimed at a popular audience, of which this was the first.

Reid's interest in number theory was sparked by her sister's use of computers to discover Mersenne primes. She published an article on a closely related topic, perfect numbers, in Scientific American in 1953, and wrote this book soon afterward. Her intended title was What Makes Numbers Interesting; the title From Zero to Infinity was a change made by the publisher.

== Topics ==
The twelve chapters of From Zero to Infinity are numbered by the ten decimal digits, $e$ (Euler's number, approximately 2.71828), and $\aleph_0$, the smallest infinite cardinal number. Each chapter's topic is in some way related to its chapter number, with a generally increasing level of sophistication as the book progresses:

- Chapter 0 discusses the history of number systems, the development of positional notation and its need for a placeholder symbol for zero, and the much later understanding of zero as being a number itself. It discusses the special properties held by zero among all other numbers, and the concept of indeterminate forms arising from division by zero.
- Chapter 1 concerns the use of numbers to count things, arithmetic, and the concepts of prime numbers and integer factorization.
- The topics of Chapter 2 include binary representation, its ancient use in peasant multiplication and in modern computer arithmetic, and its formalization as a number system by Gottfried Leibniz. More generally, it discusses the idea of number systems with different bases, and specific bases including hexadecimal.
- Chapter 3 returns to prime numbers, including the sieve of Eratosthenes for generating them as well as more modern primality tests.
- Chapter 4 concerns square numbers, the observation by Galileo that squares are equinumerous with the counting numbers, the Pythagorean theorem, Fermat's Last Theorem, and Diophantine equations more generally.
- Chapter 5 discusses figurate numbers, integer partitions, and the generating functions and pentagonal number theorem that connect these two concepts.
- In chapter 6, Reid brings in the material from her earlier article on perfect numbers (of which 6 is the smallest nontrivial example), their connection to Mersenne primes, the search for large prime numbers, and Reid's relatives' discovery of new Mersenne primes.
- Mersenne primes are the primes one unit less than a power of two. Chapter 7 instead concerns the primes that are one more than a power of two, the Fermat primes, and their close connection to constructible polygons. The heptagon, with seven sides, is the smallest polygon that is not constructible, because it is not a product of Fermat primes.
- Chapter 8 concerns the cubes and Waring's problem on representing integers as sums of cubes or other powers.
- The topic of Chapter 9 is modular arithmetic, divisibility, and their connections to positional notation, including the use of casting out nines to determine divisibility by nine.
- In Chapter $e$, From Zero to Infinity shifts from the integers to irrational numbers, complex numbers, logarithms, and Euler's formula $e^{i\pi}=1$. It connects these topics back to the integers through the theory of continued fractions and the prime number theorem.
- The final chapter, Chapter $\aleph_0$, provides a basic introduction to Aleph numbers and the theory of infinite sets, including Cantor's diagonal argument for the existence of uncountable infinite sets.

The first edition included only chapters 0 through 9. The chapter on infinite sets was added in the second edition, replacing a section on the interesting number paradox. Later editions of the book were "thoroughly updated" by Reid; in particular, the fifth edition includes updates on the search for Mersenne primes and the proof of Fermat's Last Theorem, and restores an index that had been dropped from earlier editions.

== Audience and reception ==
From Zero to Infinity has been written to be accessible both to students and non-mathematical adults, requiring only high-school level mathematics as background. Short sets of "quiz questions" at the end chapter could be helpful in sparking classroom discussions, making this useful as supplementary material for secondary-school mathematics courses.

In reviewing the fourth edition, mathematician David Singmaster describes it as "one of the classic works of mathematical popularisation since its initial appearance", and "a delightful introduction to what mathematics is about". Reviewer Lynn Godshall calls it "a highly-readable history of numbers", "easily understood by both educators and their students alike". Murray Siegel describes it as a must have for "the library of every mathematics teacher, and university faculty who prepare students to teach mathematics".

Singmaster complains only about two pieces of mathematics in the book: the assertion in chapter 4 that the Egyptians were familiar with the 3-4-5 right triangle (still the subject of considerable scholarly debate) and the omission from chapter 7 of any discussion of why classifying constructible polygons can be reduced to the case of prime numbers of sides. Siegel points out another small error, on algebraic factorization, but suggests that finding it could make another useful exercise for students.
