= Ability =

Power to perform an action

Abilities are powers an agent has to perform various actions. They include common abilities, like walking, and rare abilities, like performing a double backflip. Abilities are intelligent powers: they are guided by the person's intention and executing them successfully results in an action, which is not true for all types of powers. They are closely related to but not identical with various other concepts, such as disposition, know-how, aptitude, talent, potential, and skill.

Theories of ability aim to articulate the nature of abilities. Traditionally, the conditional analysis has been the most popular approach. According to it, having an ability means one would perform the action in question if one tried to do so. On this view, Michael Phelps has the ability to swim 200 metres in under 2 minutes because he would do so if he tried to. This approach has been criticized in various ways. Some counterexamples involve cases in which the agent is physically able to do something but unable to try, due to a strong aversion. In order to avoid these and other counterexamples, various alternative approaches have been suggested. Modal theories of ability, for example, focus on what is possible for the agent to do. Other suggestions include defining abilities in terms of dispositions and potentials.

An important distinction among abilities is between general abilities and specific abilities. General abilities are abilities possessed by an agent independent of their situation while specific abilities concern what an agent can do in a specific situation. So while an expert piano player always has the general ability to play various piano pieces, they lack the corresponding specific ability in a situation where no piano is present. Another distinction concerns the question of whether successfully performing an action by accident counts as having the corresponding ability. In this sense, an amateur hacker may have the effective ability to hack his boss's email account, because they may be lucky and guess the password correctly, but not the corresponding transparent ability, since they are unable to reliably do so.

The concept of abilities and how they are to be understood is relevant for various related fields. Free will, for example, is often understood as the ability to do otherwise. The debate between compatibilism and incompatibilism concerns the question whether this ability can exist in a world governed by deterministic laws of nature. Autonomy is a closely related concept, which can be defined as the ability of individual or collective agents to govern themselves. Whether an agent has the ability to perform a certain action is important for whether they have a moral obligation to perform this action. If they possess it, they may be morally responsible for performing it or for failing to do so. Like in the free will debate, it is also relevant whether they had the ability to do otherwise. A prominent theory of concepts and concept possession understands these terms in relation to abilities. According to it, it is required that the agent possess both the ability to discriminate between positive and negative cases and the ability to draw inferences to related concepts.

== Definition and semantic field ==
Abilities are powers an agent has to perform various actions. Some abilities are very common among human agents, like the ability to walk or to speak. Other abilities are only possessed by a few, such as the ability to perform a double backflip or to prove Gödel's incompleteness theorem. While all abilities are powers, the converse is not true, i.e. there are some powers that are not abilities. This is the case, for example, for powers that are not possessed by agents, like the power of salt to dissolve in water. But some powers possessed by agents do not constitute abilities either. For example, the power to understand French is not an ability in this sense since it does not involve an action, in contrast to the ability to speak French. This distinction depends on the difference between actions and non-actions. Actions are usually defined as events that an agent performs for a purpose and that are guided by the person's intention, in contrast to mere behavior, like involuntary reflexes. In this sense, abilities can be seen as intelligent powers.

Various terms within the semantic field of the term "ability" are sometimes used as synonyms but have slightly different connotations. Dispositions, for example, are often equated with powers and differ from abilities in the sense that they are not necessarily linked to agents and actions. Abilities are closely related to know-how, as a form of practical knowledge on how to accomplish something. But it has been argued that these two terms may not be identical since know-how belongs more to the side of knowledge of how to do something and less to the power to actually do it. The terms "aptitude" and "talent" usually refer to outstanding inborn abilities. They are often used to express that a certain set of abilities can be acquired when properly used or trained. Abilities acquired through learning are frequently referred to as skills. The term "disability" is usually used for a long-term absence of a general human ability that significantly impairs what activities one can engage in and how one can interact with the world. In this sense, not any lack of an ability constitutes a disability. The more direct antonym of "ability" is "inability" instead.

== Theories of ability ==
Various theories of the essential features of abilities have been proposed. The conditional analysis is the traditionally dominant approach. It defines abilities in terms of what one would do if one had the volition to do so. For modal theories of ability, by contrast, having an ability means that the agent has the possibility to execute the corresponding action. Other approaches include defining abilities in terms of dispositions and potentials. While all the concepts used in these different approaches are closely related, they have slightly different connotations, which often become relevant for avoiding various counterexamples.

=== Conditional analysis ===
The conditional analysis of ability is the traditionally dominant approach. It is often traced back to David Hume and defines abilities in terms of what one would do if one wanted to, tried to or had the volition to do so. It is articulated in the form of a conditional expression, for example, as "S has the ability to A iff S would A if S tried to A". On this view, Michael Phelps has the ability to swim 200 meters in under 2 minutes because he would do so if he tried to. The average person, on the other hand, lacks this ability because they would fail if they tried. Similar versions talk of having a volition instead of trying. This view can distinguish between the ability to do something and the possibility that one does something: only having the ability implies that the agent can make something happen according to their will. This definition of ability is closely related to Hume's definition of liberty as "a power of acting or not acting, according to the determinations of the will". But it is often argued that this is different from having a free will in the sense of the capacity of choosing between different courses of action.

This approach has been criticized in various ways, often by citing alleged counterexamples. Some of these counterexamples focus on cases where an ability is actually absent even though it would be present according to the conditional analysis. This is the case, for example, if someone is physically able to perform a certain action but, maybe due to a strong aversion, cannot form the volition to perform this action. So according to the conditional analysis, a person with arachnophobia has the ability to touch a trapped spider because they would do so if they tried. But all things considered, they do not have this ability since their arachnophobia makes it impossible for them to try. Another example involves a woman attacked on a dark street who would have screamed if she had tried to but was too paralyzed by fear to try it. One way to avoid this objection is to distinguish between psychological and non-psychological requirements of abilities. The conditional analysis can then be used as a partial analysis applied only to the non-psychological requirements.

Another form of criticism involves cases where the ability is present even though it would be absent according to the conditional analysis. This argument can be centered on the idea that having an ability does not ensure that each and every execution of it is successful. For example, even a good golfer may miss an easy putt on one occasion. That does not mean that they lack the ability to make this putt but this is what the conditional analysis suggests since they tried it and failed. One reply to this problem is to ascribe to the golfer the general ability, as discussed below, but deny them the specific ability in this particular instance.

=== Modal approach ===
Modal theories of ability focus not on what the agent would do under certain circumstances but on what is possible for the agent to do. This possibility is often understood in terms of possible worlds. On this view, an agent has the ability to perform a certain action if there is a complete and consistent way how the world could have been, in which the agent performs the corresponding action. This approach easily captures the idea that an agent can possess an ability without executing it. In this case, the agent does not perform the corresponding action in the actual world but there is a possible world where they perform it.

The problem with the approach described so far is that when the term "possible" is understood in the widest sense, many actions are possible even though the agent actually lacks the ability to perform them. For example, not knowing the combination of the safe, the agent lacks the ability to open the safe. But dialing the right combination is possible, i.e. there is a possible world in which, through a lucky guess, the agent succeeds at opening the safe. Because of such cases, it is necessary to add further conditions to the analysis above. These conditions play the role of restricting which possible worlds are relevant for evaluating ability-claims. Closely related to this is the converse problem concerning lucky performances in the actual world. This problem concerns the fact that an agent may successfully perform an action without possessing the corresponding ability. So a beginner at golf may hit the ball in an uncontrolled manner and through sheer luck achieve a hole-in-one. But the modal approach seems to suggest that such a beginner still has the corresponding ability since what is actual is also possible.

A series of arguments against this approach is due to Anthony Kenny, who holds that various inferences drawn in modal logic are invalid for ability ascriptions. These failures indicate that the modal approach fails to capture the logic of ability ascriptions.

It has also been argued that, strictly speaking, the conditional analysis is not different from the modal approach since it is just one special case of it. This is true if conditional expressions themselves are understood in terms of possible worlds, as suggested, for example, by David Kellogg Lewis and Robert Stalnaker. In this case, many of the arguments directed against the modal approach may equally apply to the conditional analysis.

=== Other approaches ===
The dispositional approach defines abilities in terms of dispositions. According to one version, "S has the ability to A in circumstances C iff she has the disposition to A when, in circumstances C, she tries to A". This view is closely related to the conditional analysis but differs from it because the manifestation of dispositions can be prevented through the presence of so-called masks and finks. In these cases, the disposition is still present even though the corresponding conditional is false. Another approach sees abilities as a form of potential to do something. This is different from a disposition since a disposition concerns the relation between a stimulus and a manifestation that follows when the stimulus is present. A potential, on the other hand, is characterized only by its manifestation. In the case of abilities, the manifestation concerns an action.

== Types ==
Whether it is correct to ascribe a certain ability to an agent often depends on which type of ability is meant. General abilities concern what agents can do independent of their current situation, in contrast to specific abilities. To possess an effective ability, it is sufficient if the agent can succeed through a lucky accident, which is not the case for transparent abilities.

=== General and specific ===
An important distinction among abilities is between general and specific abilities, sometimes also referred to as global and local abilities. General abilities concern what agents can do generally, i.e. independent of the situation they find themselves in. But abilities often depend for their execution on various conditions that have to be fulfilled in the given circumstances. In this sense, the term "specific ability" is used to describe whether an agent has an ability in a specific situation. So while an expert piano player always has the general ability to play various piano pieces, they lack the corresponding specific ability if they are chained to a wall, if no piano is present or if they are heavily drugged. In such cases, some of the necessary conditions for using the ability are not met. While this example illustrates a case of a general ability without a specific ability, the converse is also possible. Even though most people lack the general ability to jump 2 meters high, they may possess the specific ability to do so when they find themselves on a trampoline. The reason that they lack this general ability is that they would fail to execute it in most circumstances. It would be necessary to succeed in a suitable proportion of the relevant cases for having the general ability as well, as would be the case for a high jump athlete in this example.

It seems that the two terms are interdefinable but there is disagreement as to which one is the more basic term. So a specific ability may be defined as a general ability together with an opportunity. Having a general ability, on the other hand, can be seen as having a specific ability in various relevant situations. A similar distinction can be drawn not just for the term "ability" but also for the wider term "disposition". The distinction between general and specific abilities is not always drawn explicitly in the academic literature. While discussions often focus more on the general sense, sometimes the specific sense is intended. This distinction is relevant for various philosophical issues, specifically for the ability to do otherwise in the free will debate. If this ability is understood as a general ability, it seems to be compatible with determinism. But this seems not to be the case if a specific ability is meant.

=== Effective and transparent ===
Another distinction sometimes found in the literature concerns the question of whether successfully performing an action by accident counts as having the corresponding ability. For example, a student in the first grade is able, in a weaker sense, to recite the first 10 digits of Pi insofar as they are able to utter any permutation of the numerals from 0 to 9. But they are not able to do so in a stronger sense since they have not memorized the exact order. The weaker sense is sometimes termed effective abilities, in contrast to transparent abilities corresponding to the stronger sense. Usually, ability ascriptions have the stronger sense in mind, but this is not always the case. For example, the sentence "Usain Bolt can run 100 meters in 9.58 seconds" is usually not taken to mean that Bolt can, at will, arrive at the goal at exactly 9.58 seconds, no more and no less. Instead, he can do something that amounts to this in a weaker sense.

== Relation to other concepts ==
The concept of abilities is relevant for various other concepts and debates. Disagreements in these fields often depend on how abilities are to be understood. In the free will debate, for example, a central question is whether free will, when understood as the ability to do otherwise, can exist in a world governed by deterministic laws of nature. Free will is closely related to autonomy, which concerns the agent's ability to govern oneself. Another issue concerns whether someone has the moral obligation to perform a certain action and is responsible for succeeding or failing to do so. This issue depends, among other things, on whether the agent has the ability to perform the action in question and on whether they could have done otherwise. The ability-theory of concepts and concept possession defines them in terms of two abilities: the ability to discriminate between positive and negative cases and the ability to draw inferences to related concepts.

=== Free will ===
The topic of abilities plays an important role in the free will debate. The free will debate often centers around the question of whether the existence of free will is compatible with determinism, so-called compatibilism, or not, so-called incompatibilism. Free will is frequently defined as the ability to do otherwise while determinism can be defined as the view that the past together with the laws of nature determine everything happening in the present and the future. The conflict arises since, if everything is already fixed by the past, there seems to be no sense in which anyone could act differently than they do, i.e. that there is no place for free will. Such a result might have serious consequences since, according to some theories, people would not be morally responsible for what they do in such a case.

Having an explicit theory of what constitutes an ability is central for deciding whether determinism and free will are compatible. Different theories of ability may lead to different answers to this question. It has been argued that, according to a dispositionalist theory of ability, compatibilism is true since determinism does not exclude unmanifested dispositions. Another argument for compatibilism is due to Susan Wolf, who argues that having the type of ability relevant for moral responsibility is compatible with physical determinism since the ability to perform an action does not imply that this action is physically possible. Peter van Inwagen and others have presented arguments for incompatibilism based on the fact that the laws of nature impose limits on our abilities. These limits are so strict in the case of determinism that the only abilities possessed by anyone are the ones that are actually executed, i.e. there are no abilities to do otherwise than one actually does.

=== Autonomy ===
Autonomy is usually defined as the ability to govern oneself. It can be ascribed both to individual agents, like human persons, and to collective agents, like nations. Autonomy is absent when there is no intelligent force governing the entity's behavior at all, as in the case of a simple rock, or when this force does not belong to the governed entity, as when one nation has been invaded by another and now lacks the ability to govern itself. Autonomy is often understood in combination with a rational component, e.g. as the agent's ability to appreciate what reasons they have and to follow the strongest reason. Robert Audi, for example, characterizes autonomy as the self-governing power to bring reasons to bear in directing one's conduct and influencing one's propositional attitudes. Autonomy may also encompass the ability to question one's beliefs and desires and to change them if necessary. Some authors include the condition that decisions involved in self-governing are not determined by forces outside oneself in any way, i.e. that they are a pure expression of one's own will that is not controlled by someone else. In the Kantian tradition, autonomy is often equated with self-legislation, which may be interpreted as laying down laws or principles that are to be followed. This involves the idea that one's ability of self-governance is not just exercised on a case-by-case basis but that one takes up long-term commitments to more general principles governing many different situations.

=== Obligation and responsibility ===
The issue of abilities is closely related to the concepts of responsibility and obligation. On the side of obligation, the principle that "ought implies can" is often cited in the ethical literature. Its original formulation is attributed to Immanuel Kant. It states that an agent is only morally obligated to perform a certain action if they are able to perform this action. As a consequence of this principle, one is not justified to blame an agent for something that was out of their control. According to this principle, for example, a person sitting on the shore has no moral obligation to jump into the water to save a child drowning nearby, and should not be blamed for failing to do so, if they are unable to do so due to Paraplegia.

The problem of moral responsibility is closely related to obligation. One difference is that "obligation" tends to be understood more in a forward-looking sense in contrast to backward-looking responsibility. But these are not the only connotations of these terms. A common view concerning moral responsibility is that the ability to control one's behavior is necessary if one is to be responsible for it. This is often connected to the thesis that alternative courses of action were available to the agent, i.e. that the agent had the ability to do otherwise. But some authors, often from the incompatibilist tradition, contend that what matters for responsibility is to act as one chooses, even if no ability to do otherwise was present.

One difficulty for these principles is that our ability to do something at a certain time often depends on having done something else earlier. So a person is usually able to attend a meeting 5 minutes from now if they are currently only a few meters away from the planned location but not if they are hundreds of kilometers away. This seems to lead to the counter-intuitive consequence that people who failed to take their flight due to negligence are not morally responsible for their failure because they currently lack the corresponding ability. One way to respond to this type of example is to allow that the person is not to be blamed for their behavior 5 minutes before the meeting but hold instead that they are to be blamed for their earlier behavior that caused them to miss the flight.

=== Concepts and concept possession ===
Concepts are the basic constituents of thoughts, beliefs and propositions. As such, they play a central role for most forms of cognition. A person can only entertain a proposition if they possess the concepts involved in this proposition. For example, the proposition "wombats are animals" involves the concepts "wombat" and "animal". Someone who does not possess the concept "wombat" may still be able to read the sentence but cannot entertain the corresponding proposition. There are various theories concerning how concepts and concept possession are to be understood. One prominent suggestion sees concepts as cognitive abilities of agents. Proponents of this view often identify two central aspects that characterize concept possession: the ability to discriminate between positive and negative cases and the ability to draw inferences from this concept to related concepts. So, on the one hand, a person possessing the concept "wombat" should be able to distinguish wombats from non-wombats (like trees, DVD-players or cats). On the other hand, this person should be able to point out what follows from the fact that something is a wombat, e.g. that it is an animal, that it has short legs or that it has a slow metabolism. It is usually taken that these abilities have to be possessed to a significant degree but that perfection is not necessary. So even some people who are not aware of their slow metabolism may count as possessing the concept "wombat". Opponents of the ability-theory of concepts have argued that the abilities to discriminate and to infer are circular since they already presuppose concept possession instead of explaining it. They tend to defend alternative accounts of concepts, for example, as mental representations or as abstract objects.
