= Course-of-values recursion =

Technique for defining number-theoretic functions by recursion

In computability theory, course-of-values recursion is a technique for defining number-theoretic functions by recursion. In a definition of a function f by course-of-values recursion, the value of f(n) is computed from the sequence $\langle f(0),f(1),\ldots,f(n-1)\rangle$.

The fact that such definitions can be converted into definitions using a simpler form of recursion is often used to prove that functions defined by course-of-values recursion are primitive recursive. Contrary to course-of-values recursion, in primitive recursion the computation of a value of a function requires only the previous value; for example, for a 1-ary primitive recursive function g the value of g(n+1) is computed only from g(n) and n.

== Definition and examples ==
The factorial function n! is recursively defined by the rules

$$0! = 1,$$
$$(n+1)! = n!(n+1).$$

This recursion is a primitive recursion because it computes the next value (n+1)! of the function based on the value of n and the previous value n! of the function. On the other hand, the function Fib(n), which returns the nth Fibonacci number, is defined with the recursion equations

$$Fib(0)  = 0,$$
$$Fib(1) = 1,$$
$$Fib(n+2) = Fib(n+1) + Fib(n).$$

In order to compute Fib(n+2), the last two values of the Fib function are required. Finally, consider the function g defined with the recursion equations

$$g(0) = 0,$$
$$g(n+1) = \sum_{i = 0}^{n} g(i)^{n-i}.$$

To compute g(n+1) using these equations, all the previous values of g must be computed; no fixed finite number of previous values is sufficient in general for the computation of g. The functions Fib and g are examples of functions defined by course-of-values recursion.

In general, a function f is defined by course-of-values recursion if there is a fixed primitive recursive function h such that for all n,

$$f(n) = h(n,\langle f(0), f(1), \ldots, f(n-1)\rangle)$$

where $\langle f(0), f(1), \ldots, f(n-1)\rangle$ is a Gödel number encoding the indicated sequence. In particular

$$f(0) = h(0,\langle\rangle)$$

provides the initial value of the recursion. The function h might test its first argument to provide explicit initial values, for instance for Fib one could use the function defined by

$$h(n,s)=\begin{cases}n&\text{if }n<2\\ s[n-2]+s[n-1]&\text{if }n\geq2\end{cases}$$

where s[i] denotes extraction of the element i from an encoded sequence s; this is easily seen to be a primitive recursive function (assuming an appropriate Gödel numbering is used).

== Equivalence to primitive recursion ==
In order to convert a definition by course-of-values recursion into a primitive recursion, an auxiliary (helper) function is used. Suppose that one wants to have

$$f(n) = h(n,\langle f(0), f(1), \ldots, f(n-1)\rangle)$$.

To define f using primitive recursion, first define the auxiliary course-of-values function that should satisfy

$$\bar{f}(n) = \langle  f(0), f(1), \ldots, f(n-1)\rangle$$

where the right hand side is taken to be a Gödel numbering for sequences.

Thus $\bar{f}(n)$ encodes the first n values of f. The function $\bar{f}$ can be defined by primitive recursion because $\bar{f}(n+1)$ is obtained by appending to $\bar{f}(n)$ the new element $h(n,\bar{f}(n))$:

$$\bar{f}(0) = \langle\rangle$$,
$$\bar{f}(n+1) = \mathit{append}(n,\bar{f}(n),h(n,\bar{f}(n))),$$

where append(n,s,x) computes, whenever s encodes a sequence of length n, a new sequence t of length n + 1 such that t[n] = x and t[i] = s[i] for all i < n. This is a primitive recursive function, under the assumption of an appropriate Gödel numbering; h is assumed primitive recursive to begin with. Thus the recursion relation can be written as primitive recursion:

$$\bar{f}(n+1) = g(n,\bar{f}(n))$$

where g is itself primitive recursive, being the composition of two such functions:

$$g(i,j) = \mathit{append}(i,j,h(i,j)),$$

Given $\bar{f}$, the original function f can be defined by $f(n)=\bar{f}(n+1)[n]$, which shows that it is also a primitive recursive function.

== Application to primitive recursive functions ==
In the context of primitive recursive functions, it is convenient to have a means to represent finite sequences of natural numbers as single natural numbers. One such method, Gödel's encoding, represents a sequence of positive integers $\langle n_0,n_1,n_2,\ldots,n_k\rangle$ as

$$\prod_{i = 0}^k p_i^{n_i}$$,

where p_{i} represent the ith prime number. It can be shown that, with this representation, the ordinary operations on sequences are all primitive recursive. These operations include

- Determining the length of a sequence,
- Extracting an element from a sequence given its index,
- Concatenating two sequences.

Using this representation of sequences, it can be seen that if h(m) is primitive recursive then the function

$$f(n) = h(\langle f(0), f(1), f(2), \ldots, f(n-1)\rangle)$$.

is also primitive recursive.

When the sequence $\langle n_0,n_1,n_2,\ldots,n_k\rangle$ is allowed to include zeros, it is instead represented as

$$\prod_{i = 0}^k p_i^{(n_i +1)}$$,

which makes it possible to distinguish the codes for the sequences $\langle 0 \rangle$ and $\langle 0,0\rangle$.

== Limitations ==
Not every recursive definition can be transformed into a primitive recursive definition. One known example is Ackermann's function, which is of the form A(m,n) and is provably not primitive recursive.

Indeed, every new value A(m+1, n+1) depends on the sequence of previously defined values A(i, j), but the i-s and j-s for which A(i, j) should be included in this sequence depend themselves on previously computed values of the function; namely (i, j) = (m, A(m+1, n)). Thus one cannot encode the previously computed sequence of values in a primitive recursive way in the manner suggested above (or at all, as it turns out this function is not primitive recursive).
