= The Penguin Dictionary of Curious and Interesting Numbers =

Book by David Wells

- Cover of the first edition
- Author: David Wells
- Language: English
- Subject: Recreational mathematics, elementary number theory
- Genre: Non-fiction
- Publisher: Penguin Books
- Publication date: 1986
- Publication place: United Kingdom
- Media type: Print (paperback)
- Pages: 229 pp (first edition)
- ISBN: 0-14-008029-5

The Penguin Dictionary of Curious and Interesting Numbers is a reference book for recreational mathematics and elementary number theory written by David Wells. (Note: Cf. „Wells, David Graham“ in zbMATH Open .) The first edition was published in paperback by Penguin Books in 1986 in the UK, and a revised edition appeared in 1997 (ISBN 0-14-026149-4).

== Contents ==
The entries are arranged in increasing order of magnitude, with the exception of the first entry on −1 and i. The book includes some irrational numbers below 10 but concentrates on integers, and has an entry for every integer up to 42. The final entry is for Graham's number.

In addition to the dictionary itself, the book includes a list of mathematicians in chronological sequence (all born before 1890), a short glossary, and a brief bibliography. The back of the book contains eight short tables "for the benefit of readers who cannot wait to look for their own patterns and properties", including lists of polygonal numbers, Fibonacci numbers, prime numbers, factorials, decimal reciprocals of primes, factors of repunits, and lastly the prime factorization and the values of the functions φ(n), d(n) and σ(n) for the first hundred integers. The book concludes with a conventional, alphabetical index.

== Reviews ==
In a review of several books in The College Mathematics Journal, Brian Blank described it as "a charming and interesting book", and the Chicago Tribune described the revised edition as "a fascinating book on all things numerical". By contrast, Christopher Hirst called it "a volume which none but propeller-heads will find either curious or interesting" in a review of another book in The Independent.

== Style ==
Beside the serious mathematics and number theory, Wells occasionally makes humorous or playful comments on the numbers he is discussing. For example, his entry for the number 39 largely consists of a joke involving the interesting number paradox:

39

This appears to be the first uninteresting number, which of course makes it an especially interesting number, because it is the smallest number to have the property of being uninteresting.

It is therefore also the first number to be simultaneously interesting and uninteresting. (pg. 120)

== See also ==
- List of notable numbers
- On-Line Encyclopedia of Integer Sequences
