= Description number =

Numbers that arise in the theory of Turing machines

Description numbers are numbers that arise in the theory of Turing machines. They are very similar to Gödel numbers, and are also occasionally called "Gödel numbers" in the literature. Given some universal Turing machine (UTM), every Turing machine can, given its encoding on that machine, be assigned a number. This is the machine's description number. These numbers play a key role in Alan Turing's proof of the undecidability of the halting problem, and are very useful in reasoning about Turing machines as well.

== An example of a description number ==
Say we had a Turing machine M with states q_{1}, ... q_{R}, with a tape alphabet with symbols s_{1}, ..., s_{m}, with the blank denoted by s_{0}, and transitions giving the current state, current symbol, and actions performed (which might be to overwrite the current tape symbol and move the tape head left or right, or maybe not move it at all), and the next state. Under the original universal machine described by Alan Turing, this machine would be encoded as input to it as follows:

1. The state q_{i} is encoded by the letter 'D' followed by the letter 'A' repeated i times (a unary encoding)
2. The tape symbol s_{j} is encoded by the letter 'D' followed by the letter 'C' repeated j times
3. The transitions are encoded by giving the state, input symbol, symbol to write on the tape, direction to move (expressed by the letters 'L', 'R', or 'N', for left, right, or no movement), and the next state to enter, with states and symbols encoded as above.

The UTM's input thus consists of the transitions separated by semicolons, so its input alphabet consists of the seven symbols, 'D', 'A', 'C', 'L', 'R', 'N', and ';'. For example, for a very simple Turing machine that alternates printing 0 and 1 on its tape forever:

1. State: q_{1}, input symbol: blank, action: print 1, move right, next state: q_{2}
2. State: q_{2}, input symbol: blank, action: print 0, move right, next state: q_{1}

Letting the blank be s_{0}, '0' be s_{1} and '1' be s_{2}, the machine would be encoded by the UTM as:

DADDCCRDAA;DAADDCRDA;

But then, if we replaced each of the seven symbols 'A' by 1, 'C' by 2, 'D' by 3, 'L' by 4, 'R' by 5, 'N' by 6, and ';' by 7, we would have an encoding of the Turing machine as a natural number: this is the description number of that Turing machine under Turing's universal machine. The simple Turing machine described above would thus have the description number 313322531173113325317. There is an analogous process for every other type of universal Turing machine. It is usually not necessary to actually compute a description number in this way: the point is that every natural number may be interpreted as the code for at most one Turing machine, though many natural numbers may not be the code for any Turing machine (or to put it another way, they represent Turing machines that have no states). The fact that such a number always exists for any Turing machine is generally the important thing.

== Application to undecidability proofs ==
Description numbers play a key role in many undecidability proofs, such as the proof that the halting problem is undecidable. In the first place, the existence of this direct correspondence between natural numbers and Turing machines shows that the set of all Turing machines is denumerable, and since the set of all partial functions is uncountably infinite, there must certainly be many functions that cannot be computed by Turing machines.

By making use of a technique similar to Cantor's diagonal argument, it is possible exhibit such an uncomputable function, for example, that the halting problem in particular is undecidable. First, let us denote by U(e, x) the action of the universal Turing machine given a description number e and input x, returning 0 if e is not the description number of a valid Turing machine. Now, supposing that there were some algorithm capable of settling the halting problem, i.e. a Turing machine TEST(e) which given the description number of some Turing machine would return 1 if the Turing machine halts on every input, or 0 if there are some inputs that would cause it to run forever. By combining the outputs of these machines, it should be possible to construct another machine δ(k) that returns U(k, k) + 1 if TEST(k) is 1 and 0 if TEST(k) is 0. From this definition δ is defined for every input and must naturally be total recursive. Since δ is built up from what we have assumed are Turing machines as well then it too must have a description number, call it e. So, we can feed the description number e to the UTM again, and by definition, δ(k) = U(e, k), so δ(e) = U(e, e). But since TEST(e) is 1, by our other definition, δ(e) = U(e, e) + 1, leading to a contradiction. Thus, TEST(e) cannot exist, and in this way we have settled the halting problem as undecidable.

== See also ==
- Church numeral
