= Constance Reid =

American writer (1918–2010)

- Reid in 2001
- Born: Constance Bowman; January 3, 1918; St. Louis, Missouri, U.S.
- Died: October 14, 2010 (aged 92); San Francisco, California, U.S.
- Occupations: Mathematics popularizer and biographer
- Spouse: Neil D. Reid
- Relatives: Julia Robinson (sister); Raphael M. Robinson (brother-in-law)
- Writing career
- Notable works: From Zero to Infinity; Hilbert; Julia: A Life in Mathematics
- Notable awards: George Pólya Award; Beckenbach Book Prize; JPBM Communications Award

Constance Bowman Reid (January 3, 1918 – October 14, 2010) was the author of several biographies of mathematicians and popular books about mathematics. She received several awards for mathematical exposition. She was not a mathematician but came from a mathematical family—one of her sisters was Julia Robinson, and her brother-in-law was Raphael M. Robinson.

== Background and education ==
Reid was born in St. Louis, Missouri, the daughter of Ralph Bowers Bowman and Helen (Hall) Bowman. One of her younger sisters was the mathematician Julia Robinson. The family moved to Arizona and then to San Diego when the girls were a few years old. In 1950 she married a law student, Neil D. Reid, with whom she had two children, Julia and Stewart.

Reid received a Bachelor of Arts degree from San Diego State University in 1938 and a Master of Education degree from University of California, Berkeley in 1949. She worked as a teacher of English and journalism at San Diego High School from 1939 to 1950, and as a free-lance writer since then. She has said, "I always wanted to be a writer, but it took me a while to find my subject."

== Works ==
Reid's first published work was a memoir of her work in a World War II bomber factory, Slacks and Calluses, published in 1944. She also published a short story.

Her first mathematical publication was an article on perfect numbers for Scientific American. Reid remarked in an interview that some readers objected to her as an author: "But the readers (maybe, just one reader, I have forgotten now) objected that articles in Scientific American should be written by authorities in their fields and not by housewives!"

The Scientific American article led to an invitation from Robert L. Crowell of the Thomas Y. Crowell Co. publishing house to write "a little book on numbers" that became From Zero to Infinity. Two more popular math books for Crowell followed: Introduction to Higher Mathematics for the General Reader in 1959 and A Long Way from Euclid in 1963.

After writing these books she felt she had run out of ideas, and her sister Julia Robinson suggested that she should update Eric Temple Bell's collection of mathematical biographies, Men of Mathematics. After travelling to Göttingen to absorb some mathematical culture, Reid decided instead to write a full-length biography of David Hilbert, who she considered the greatest mathematician of the first half of the twentieth century. Julia encouraged her in this project, and the biography was published in 1970 as Hilbert. The Hilbert biography was a success among mathematicians, and her next book was a biography of another Göttingen figure, Richard Courant, published in 1976 as Courant in Göttingen and New York. Her next book, published in 1982, was a biography of the mathematical statistician Jerzy Neyman, who like Courant had emigrated to the United States and built a new career there.

An attempt to write a biography of Eric Temple Bell proved unexpectedly difficult, as he had been very secretive about his early life. Reid discovered that Bell, a native of Scotland, as a young man had spent twelve years in the United States but had never revealed this to his wife or his son. The resulting book, The Search for E. T. Bell, published in 1993, is more of a detective story than a true biography.

Her sister Julia gradually became more famous, and was elected to the United States National Academy of Sciences in 1976 and President of the American Mathematical Society in 1983. Several people had suggested to Constance that she write a biography of Julia, but Julia always refused to cooperate because she felt scientific biographies should be about science, not about personalities. In 1985, when Julia was dying, she unbent enough to allow Constance to write a biographical sketch of her, that was published after Julia's death as "The Autobiography of Julia Robinson" (written by Constance but written in the first person as if by Julia) The sketch was published with additional material as a book, Julia: A Life in Mathematics in 1996.

== Awards ==
Reid won several awards for mathematical exposition. These include:

- Mathematical Association of America's George Pólya Award in 1987 for her article "The Autobiography of Julia Robinson"
- Mathematical Association of America's Beckenbach Book Prize in 1996 for her book The Search for E. T. Bell : Also Known as John Taine
- Joint Policy Board for Mathematics 1998 Communications Award for the body of her work in bringing accurate mathematical information to non-mathematical audiences

== Publications ==
- Reid, Constance (March 1953). "Perfect Numbers". Scientific American. 188 (3): 84. Bibcode:1953SciAm.188c..84R. doi:10.1038/scientificamerican0353-84. ISSN 0036-8733.
- Reid, Constance; Robinson, Julia (1986). "The Autobiography of Julia Robinson". College Mathematics Journal. 17 (1). Mathematical Association of America: 2–21. doi:10.2307/2686866. JSTOR 2686866.
- From zero to infinity. What makes numbers interesting. Fifth edition. Fiftieth anniversary edition. A K Peters, Ltd., Wellesley, MA, 2006. xviii+188 pp. ISBN 1-56881-273-6
- Introduction to Higher Mathematics: For the General Reader. New York: Thomas Y. Crowell. 1959.
- A long way from Euclid. Reprint of the 1963 original. Dover Publications, Inc., Mineola, NY, 2004. ISBN 0-486-43613-6
- Courant in Göttingen and New York. The story of an improbable mathematician. Springer-Verlag, New York–Heidelberg, 1976. ISBN 0-387-90194-9 Reprint of the 1976 original: Copernicus, New York, 1996. ISBN 0-387-94670-5
- Neyman. Reprint of the 1982 original. Springer-Verlag, New York, 1998. ISBN 0-387-98357-0
- Hilbert. Reprint of the 1970 original. Copernicus, New York, 1996. ISBN 0-387-94674-8
- Julia. A life in mathematics. MAA Spectrum. Mathematical Association of America, Washington, DC, 1996. ISBN 0-88385-520-8
- The Search for E. T. Bell : Also Known as John Taine. Mathematical Association of America, Washington, DC, 1993. ISBN 0-88385-508-9
- Slacks and Calluses: Our Summer in a Bomber Factory (autobiography) Smithsonian Institution Press, Washington, DC, 1999. Reprint of Longmans, Green, New York, 1944 edition. ISBN 1-56098-368-X
