= Julia Robinson =

American mathematician (1919–1985)

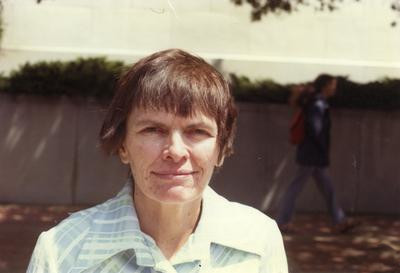
- Robinson in 1975
- Born: Julia Hall Bowman; December 8, 1919; St. Louis, Missouri, United States
- Died: July 30, 1985 (aged 65); Oakland, California, United States
- Education: University of California, Berkeley
- Known for: Diophantine equations Decidability; MRDP theorem Robinson's proof
- Spouse: Raphael M. Robinson
- Awards: Noether Lecture (1982); MacArthur Fellow
- Scientific career
- Fields: Mathematician
- Workplaces: University of California, Berkeley
- Doctoral advisor: Alfred Tarski

Julia Hall Bowman Robinson (December 8, 1919 – July 30, 1985) was an American mathematician noted for her contributions to the fields of computability theory and computational complexity theory—most notably in decision problems. Her work on Hilbert's tenth problem (now known as Matiyasevich's theorem or the MRDP theorem) played a crucial role in its ultimate resolution. Robinson was a professor at UC Berkeley, the first female mathematician to be elected to the National Academy of Sciences, and a 1983 MacArthur Fellow.

== Early years ==
Robinson was born in St. Louis, Missouri, the daughter of Ralph Bowers Bowman and Helen (Hall) Bowman. Her father owned a machine equipment company while her mother was a school teacher before marriage. Her mother died when Robinson was 2 years old and her father remarried. Her older sister was the mathematical popularizer and biographer Constance Reid and her younger sister is Billie Comstock.

When she was 9 years old, she was diagnosed with scarlet fever, which was shortly followed by rheumatic fever. This caused her to miss two years of school. When she was well again, she was privately tutored by a retired primary school teacher. In just one year, she was able to complete fifth, sixth, seventh and eighth year curriculum. While in junior high school, she was given an IQ test in which she scored a 98, a couple points below average, which she explains away as being "unaccustomed to taking tests". Nevertheless, Julia stood out in San Diego High School as the only female student taking advanced classes in mathematics and physics. She graduated high school with a Bausch-Lomb award for being overall outstanding in science.

In 1936, Robinson entered San Diego State University at the age of 16. Dissatisfied with the mathematics curriculum at San Diego State University, she transferred to University of California, Berkeley in 1939 for her senior year. Before she was able to transfer to UC Berkeley, her father committed suicide in 1937 due to financial insecurities. She took five mathematics courses in her first year at Berkeley, one being a number theory course taught by Raphael M. Robinson. She received her BA degree in 1940, and later married Raphael in 1941.

== Mathematical contributions ==
After graduating, Robinson continued in graduate studies at Berkeley. As a graduate student, Robinson was employed as a teaching assistant with the Department of Mathematics and later as a statistics lab assistant by Jerzy Neyman in the Berkeley Statistical Laboratory, where her work resulted in her first published paper, titled "A Note on Exact Sequential Analysis".

Robinson received her PhD degree in 1948 under Alfred Tarski with a dissertation on "Definability and Decision Problems in Arithmetic". Her dissertation showed that the theory of the rational numbers was an undecidable, by demonstrating that elementary number theory could be defined in terms of the rationals. (Elementary number theory was already known to be undecidable by Gödel's first incompleteness theorem.)

Here is an excerpt from her thesis:

"This consequence of our discussion is interesting because of a result of Gödel which shows that the variety of relations between integers (and operations on integers) which are arithmetically definable in terms of addition and multiplication of integers is very great. For instance from Theorem 3.2 and Gödel's result, we can conclude that the relation which holds between three rationals A, B, and N if and only if N is a positive integer and A=B^{N} is definable in the arithmetic of rationals."

=== Hilbert's tenth problem ===
Hilbert's tenth problem asks for an algorithm to determine whether a Diophantine equation has any solutions in integers. Robinson began exploring methods for this problem in 1948 while at the RAND Corporation. Her work regarding Diophantine representation for exponentiation and her method of using Pell's equation led to the J.R. hypothesis (named after Robinson) in 1950. Proving this hypothesis would be central in the eventual solution. Her research publications would lead to collaborations with Martin Davis, Hilary Putnam, and Yuri Matiyasevich.

In 1950, Robinson first met Martin Davis, then an instructor at the University of Illinois at Urbana-Champaign, who was trying to show that all sets with listability property were Diophantine in contrast to Robinson's attempt to show that a few special sets—including prime numbers and the powers of 2—were Diophantine. Robinson and Davis started collaborating in 1959 and were later joined by Hilary Putnam, they then showed that the solutions to a "Goldilocks" equation was key to Hilbert's tenth problem.

In 1970, the problem was resolved in the negative; that is, they showed that no such algorithm can exist. Through the 1970s, Robinson continued working with Matiyasevich on one of their solution's corollaries, which she once stated that

there is a constant N such that, given a Diophantine equation with any number of parameters and in any number of unknowns, one can effectively transform this equation into another with the same parameters but in only N unknowns such that both equations are solvable or unsolvable for the same values of the parameters.

At the time the solution was first published, the authors established N = 200. Robinson and Matiyasevich's joint work would produce further reduction to 9 unknowns.

=== Game theory ===
During the late 1940s, Robinson spent about a year at the RAND Corporation in Santa Monica researching game theory. Her 1949 technical report, "On the Hamiltonian game (a traveling salesman problem)," is the first publication to use the phrase "travelling salesman problem". In 1951 she published a paper titled "An Iterative Method of Solving a Game", proving that the fictitious play dynamics converges to the mixed strategy Nash equilibrium in two-player zero-sum games. This was posed by George W. Brown as a prize problem at RAND Corporation.

== Professorship at UC Berkeley ==
Robinson was not allowed to teach in the Mathematics Department at Berkeley after marrying Raphael M. Robinson in 1941, as there was a rule that prevented family members from working together in the same department. Robinson then instead stayed in the statistics department despite wanting to teach calculus. Although Raphael retired in 1973, it was not until 1976 she was offered a full-time professorship position at Berkeley after the department heard of her nomination to the National Academy of Sciences.

== Honors ==
After Yuri Matiyasevich solved Hilbert's tenth problem by means of the J.R. hypothesis and the Fibonacci number sequence, Saunders Mac Lane nominated Robinson for the National Academy of Sciences. Alfred Tarski and Jerzy Neyman also flew out to Washington, D.C. to further explain to the National Academy of Sciences why her work is so important and how it tremendously contributed to mathematics. In 1975, she was the first female mathematician to be elected to the National Academy of Sciences.

Robinson was chosen as the first female president of the American Mathematical Society (for the term of 1983–1984) but was unable to complete her term as she was suffering from leukemia. It took time for her to accept the nomination, as stated in her autobiography:

"In 1982 I was nominated for the presidency of the American Mathematical Society. I realized that I had been chosen because I was a woman and because I had the seal of approval, as it were, of the National Academy. After discussion with Raphael, who thought I should decline and save my energy for mathematics, and other members of my family, who differed with him, I decided that as a woman and a mathematician I had no alternative but to accept. I have always tried to do everything I could to encourage talented women to become research mathematicians. I found my service as president of the Society taxing but very, very satisfying."

In 1982, Robinson gave the Noether Lecture of the Association for Women in Mathematics; her lecture was called Functional Equations in Arithmetic. Around this time she also was given the MacArthur Fellowship prize of $60,000. In 1985, she also became a member of the American Academy of Arts and Sciences.

== Political work ==
In the 1950s Robinson was active in local Democratic party activities. She was Alan Cranston's campaign manager in Contra Costa County when he ran for his first political office, state controller.

"I don't remember exactly what happened, but the end result was that Julia involved herself during those years in the nitty-gritty of Democratic Party politics—she registered voters, stuffed envelopes, rang door- bells in neighborhoods where people expected to be paid for their vote. She even served as Alan Cranston's campaign manager for Contra Costa County when he successfully ran for state controller—his first political office."

— Constance Reid

Robinson was also a volunteer for Adlai Stevenson's presidential campaigns.

== Death and legacy ==
In 1984, Robinson was diagnosed with leukemia, and she died in Oakland, California, on July 30, 1985.

"One of Julia's last requests was that there be no funeral service and that those wishing to make a gift in her memory contribute to the Alfred Tarski Fund, which she had been instrumental in setting up in honor of her late teacher, friend, and colleague. Modest to the end, she let her character and achievements speak for themselves."

— Solomon Feferman

One of her sisters, Constance Reid, won the Mathematical Association of America's George Pólya Award in 1987 for writing the article "The Autobiography of Julia Robinson".

The Julia Robinson Mathematics Festival, sponsored by the American Institute of Mathematics from 2013 to the present and by the Mathematical Sciences Research Institute from 2007 to 2013, was named in her honor.

George Csicsery produced and directed a one-hour documentary about Robinson titled Julia Robinson and Hilbert's Tenth Problem, that premiered at the Joint Mathematics Meeting in San Diego on January 7, 2008. Notices of the American Mathematical Society printed a film review and an interview with the director. The College Mathematics Journal also published a film review.

== Notes ==
- Davis, Martin (1970–1980). "Robinson, Julia Bowman". Dictionary of Scientific Biography. Vol. 24. New York: Charles Scribner's Sons. pp. 265–268. ISBN 978-0-684-10114-9.
- Feferman, Solomon, ed. (1996). The Collected Works of Julia Robinson. Providence, Rhode Island: American Mathematical Society. ISBN 978-0-8218-0575-6.
- Matijasevich, Yuri (1992). "My collaboration with Julia Robinson". The Mathematical Intelligencer. 14 (4): 38–45. doi:10.1007/BF03024472. ISSN 0343-6993. MR 1188142. S2CID 123582378. Archived from the original on November 12, 2020.
- Lamb, Evelyn (November 22, 2019). "How Julia Robinson helped define the limits of mathematical knowledge". ScienceNews.org.
