= Raphael M. Robinson =

American mathematician (1911–1995)

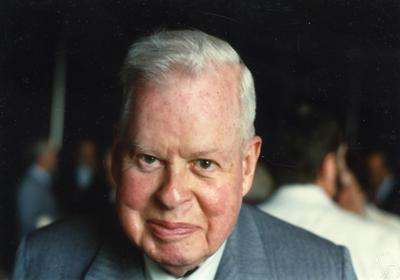
- Born: November 2, 1911; National City, California
- Died: January 27, 1995 (aged 83); Berkeley, California
- Education: California
- Spouse: Julia Robinson
- Scientific career
- Fields: Mathematics

Raphael Mitchel Robinson (November 2, 1911 – January 27, 1995) was an American mathematician.

Born in National City, California, Robinson was the youngest of four children of a lawyer and a teacher. He was awarded from the University of California, Berkeley in mathematics: the BA (1932), MA (1933), and Ph.D. (1935). His Ph.D. thesis, on complex analysis, was titled Some results in the theory of Schlicht functions.

In 1941, Robinson married his former student Julia Bowman. She became his Berkeley colleague and the first woman president of the American Mathematical Society.

Robinson worked on mathematical logic, set theory, geometry, number theory, and combinatorics. In 1937 he set out a simpler and more conventional version of the John von Neumann 1923 axiomatic set theory. Soon after Alfred Tarski joined Berkeley's mathematics department in 1942, Robinson began to do major work on the foundations of mathematics, building on Tarski's concept of essential undecidabilility, by proving a number of mathematical theories undecidable. In 1950 Robinson proved that an essentially undecidable theory need not have an infinite number of axioms by coming up with a counterexample: Robinson arithmetic Q. Q is finitely axiomatizable because it lacks Peano arithmetic's axiom schema of induction; nevertheless Q, like Peano arithmetic, is incomplete and undecidable in the sense of Gödel. Robinson's work on undecidability culminated in his coauthoring Tarski et al. (1953), which established, among other things, the undecidability of group theory, lattice theory, abstract projective geometry, and closure algebras.

Robinson worked in number theory, even employing very early computers to obtain results. For example, he coded the Lucas–Lehmer primality test to determine whether 2^{n} − 1 was prime for all prime n < 2304 on a SWAC. In 1952, he showed that these Mersenne numbers were all composite except for 17 values of n = 2, 3, 5, 7, 13, 17, 19, 31, 61, 89, 107, 127, 521, 607, 1279, 2203, 2281. He discovered the last five of these Mersenne primes, the largest ones known at the time.

Robinson wrote several papers on tilings of the plane, in particular a clear and remarkable 1971 paper Undecidability and nonperiodicity for tilings of the plane simplifying what had been a tangled theory.

Robinson became a full professor at Berkeley in 1949, retired in 1973, and remained active in his educational interests for the duration of his life having published late in his life:

- (age 80 years) Minsky's small universal Turing machine, describing a universal Turing machine with four symbols and seven states;
- (age 83 years) Two figures in the hyperbolic plane.

== See also ==
- Robinson arithmetic

== Publications ==
- —— (1937). "The theory of classes: A modification of Von Neumann's system". Journal of Symbolic Logic. 2 (1): 29–36. doi:10.2307/2268798. JSTOR 2268798.
- —— (1950). "An Essentially Undecidable Axiom System". Proceedings of the International Congress of Mathematicians. pp. 729–730. LCCN 52001808.
- Tarski, Alfred; Mostowski, Andrzej; —— (1953). Undecidable theories. North Holland.

Tarski, Alfred; Mostowski, Andrzej; —— (2010) [1953]. Undecidable Theories: Studies in Logic and the Foundation of Mathematics. Dover Books on Mathematics (reprint ed.). Mineola, N.Y.: Dover Publications. ISBN 9780486477039. LCCN 2010019851.

- —— (1954). "Mersenne and Fermat numbers". Proc. Amer. Math. Soc. Vol. 5. pp. 842–846. doi:10.1090/S0002-9939-1954-0064787-4. ISSN 0002-9939.
- —— (1971). "Undecidability and nonperiodicity for tilings of the plane". Inventiones Mathematicae. 12 (3): 177–209. doi:10.1007/BF01418780. ISSN 0020-9910.
- —— (1991). "Minsky's small universal Turing machine". International Journal of Mathematics. 2 (5): 551–562. doi:10.1142/S0129167X91000302.
- —— (1994). "Two figures in the hyperbolic plane". International Journal of Mathematics. 5 (3): 421–423. doi:10.1142/S0129167X94000231.
