= Schröder–Bernstein =

Schröder–Bernstein may refer to:

- the Schröder–Bernstein theorem in set theory
- Schröder–Bernstein theorem for measurable spaces
- Schröder–Bernstein theorems for operator algebras
- Schröder–Bernstein property
