= Ernst Schröder (mathematician) =

German mathematician (1841–1902)

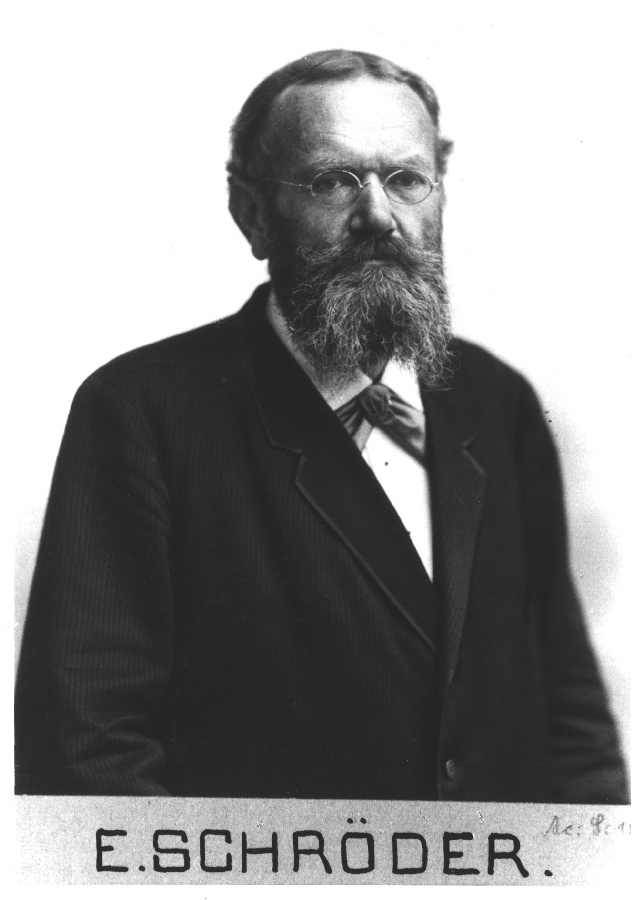
- Born: 25 November 1841; Mannheim, Grand Duchy of Baden
- Died: 16 June 1902 (aged 60); Karlsruhe, German Empire
- Scientific career
- Fields: Mathematics

Friedrich Wilhelm Karl Ernst Schröder (German: [ˈʃʁøːdɐ]; 25 November 1841 – 16 June 1902) was a German mathematician mainly known for his work on algebraic logic. He is a major figure in the history of mathematical logic, by virtue of summarizing and extending the work of George Boole, Augustus De Morgan, Hugh MacColl, and especially Charles Peirce. He is best known for his monumental Vorlesungen über die Algebra der Logik (Lectures on the Algebra of Logic, 1890–1905), in three volumes, which prepared the way for the emergence of mathematical logic as a separate discipline in the twentieth century by systematizing the various systems of formal logic of the day.

== Life ==
Schröder learned mathematics at Heidelberg, Königsberg, and Zürich, under Otto Hesse, Gustav Kirchhoff, and Franz Neumann. After teaching school for a few years, he moved to the Technische Hochschule Darmstadt in 1874. Two years later, he took up a chair in mathematics at the Karlsruhe Polytechnische Schule, where he spent the remainder of his life. He never married.

== Work ==
Schröder's early work on formal algebra and logic was written in ignorance of the British logicians George Boole and Augustus De Morgan. Instead, his sources were texts by Ohm, Hankel, Hermann Grassmann, and Robert Grassmann (Peckhaus 1997: 233–296). In 1873, Schröder learned of Boole's and De Morgan's work on logic. To their work he subsequently added several important concepts due to Charles Sanders Peirce, including subsumption and quantification.

Schröder also made original contributions to algebra, set theory, lattice theory, ordered sets and ordinal numbers. Along with Georg Cantor, he codiscovered the Cantor–Bernstein–Schröder theorem, although Schröder's proof (1898) is flawed. Felix Bernstein (1878–1956) subsequently corrected the proof as part of his Ph.D. dissertation.

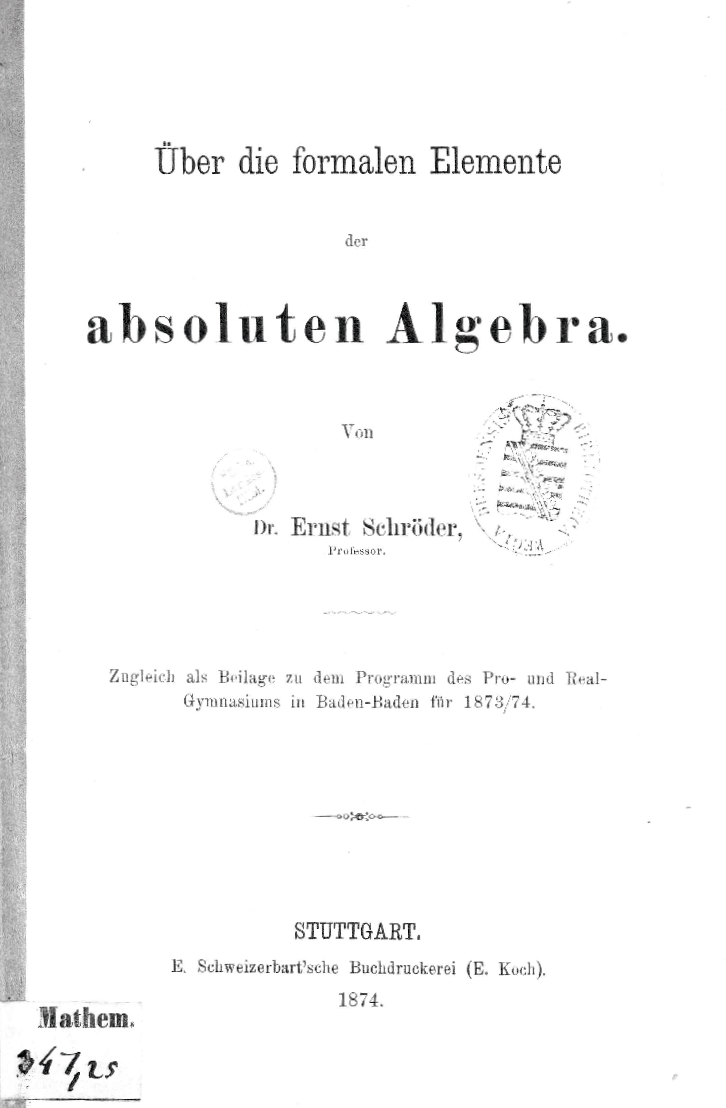
title page of first printing of "Über die formalen Elemente der absoluten Algebra" (on the formal elements of the absolute algebra)

Schröder (1877) was a concise exposition of Boole's ideas on algebra and logic, which did much to introduce Boole's work to continental readers. The influence of the Grassmanns, especially Robert's little-known Formenlehre, is clear. Unlike Boole, Schröder fully appreciated duality. John Venn and Christine Ladd-Franklin both warmly cited this short book of Schröder's, and Charles Sanders Peirce used it as a text while teaching at Johns Hopkins University.

Schröder's masterwork, his Vorlesungen über die Algebra der Logik, was published in three volumes between 1890 and 1905, at the author's expense. Vol. 2 is in two parts, the second published posthumously, edited by Eugen Müller. The Vorlesungen was a comprehensive and scholarly survey of algebraic logic up to the end of the 19th century, one that had a considerable influence on the emergence of mathematical logic in the 20th century. He developed Boole's algebra into a calculus of relations, based on composition of relations as a multiplication. The Schröder rules relate alternative interpretations of a product of relations.

The Vorlesungen is a prolix affair, only a small part of which has been translated into English. That part, along with an extended discussion of the entire Vorlesungen, is in Brady (2000). Also see Grattan-Guinness (2000: 159–76).

Schröder said his aim was:

...to design logic as a calculating discipline, especially to give access to the exact handling of relative concepts, and, from then on, by emancipation from the routine claims of natural language, to withdraw any fertile soil from "cliché" in the field of philosophy as well. This should prepare the ground for a scientific universal language that looks more like a sign language than like a sound language.

== Influence ==
Schröder's influence on the early development of the predicate calculus, mainly by popularising C. S. Peirce's work on quantification, is at least as great as that of Frege or Peano. For an example of the influence of Schröder's work on English-speaking logicians of the early 20th century, see Clarence Irving Lewis (1918). The relational concepts that pervade Principia Mathematica are very much owed to the Vorlesungen, cited in Principia's Preface and in Bertrand Russell's Principles of Mathematics.

Frege (1960) dismissed Schröder's work, and admiration for Frege's pioneering role has dominated subsequent historical discussion. Contrasting Frege with Schröder and C. S. Peirce, however, Hilary Putnam (1982) writes:

When I started to trace the later development of logic, the first thing I did was to look at Schröder's Vorlesungen über die Algebra der Logik, ...[whose] third volume is on the logic of relations (Algebra und Logik der Relative, 1895). The three volumes immediately became the best-known advanced logic text, and embody what any mathematician interested in the study of logic should have known, or at least have been acquainted with, in the 1890s.

While, to my knowledge, no one except Frege ever published a single paper in Frege's notation, many famous logicians adopted Peirce-Schröder notation, and famous results and systems were published in it. Löwenheim stated and proved the Löwenheim theorem (later reproved and strengthened by Thoralf Skolem, whose name became attached to it together with Löwenheim's) in Peircian notation. In fact, there is no reference in Löwenheim's paper to any logic other than Peirce's. To cite another example, Zermelo presented his axioms for set theory in Peirce-Schröder notation, and not, as one might have expected, in Russell-Whitehead notation.

One can sum up these simple facts (which anyone can quickly verify) as follows: Frege certainly discovered the quantifier first (four years before Oscar Howard Mitchell, going by publication dates, which are all we have as far as I know). But Leif Ericson probably discovered America "first" (forgive me for not counting the native Americans, who of course really discovered it "first"). If the effective discoverer, from a European point of view, is Christopher Columbus, that is because he discovered it so that it stayed discovered (by Europeans, that is), so that the discovery became known (by Europeans). Frege did "discover" the quantifier in the sense of having the rightful claim to priority; but Peirce and his students discovered it in the effective sense. The fact is that until Russell appreciated what he had done, Frege was relatively obscure, and it was Peirce who seems to have been known to the entire world logical community. How many of the people who think that "Frege invented logic" are aware of these facts?

== Works ==
- Schröder, E., 1877. Der Operationskreis des Logikkalküls. Leipzig: B.G. Teubner.
- Schröder, E., 1890–1905. Vorlesungen über die Algebra der Logik, 3 vols. Leipzig: B.G. Teubner. Reprints: 1966, Chelsea; 2000, Thoemmes Press.
  - Vorlesungen über die Algebra der Logik (Exakte Logik), Volume 1,
  - Vorlesungen über die Algebra der Logik (Exakte Logik), Volume 2, Abt. 1
  - Vorlesungen über die Algebra der Logik (Exakte Logik), Volume 2, Abt. 2
  - Algebra und Logik der Relative, der Vorlesungen über die Algebra der Logik 3, Volume 3, Abt. 1
- Schröder, E., 1898. "Über zwei Definitionen der Endlichkeit und G. Cantor'sche Sätze", Abh. Kaiserl. Leop.-Car. Akad. Naturf 71: 301–362.

Anthologies

- Brady, Geraldine, 2000. From Peirce to Skolem. North Holland. Includes an English translation of parts of the Vorlesungen.

== See also ==
- Schröder's equation
- Schröder number
- Schröder–Bernstein property
- Schröder–Bernstein theorem for measurable spaces
- Schröder–Hipparchus number
