= Deborah Joseph =

American computer scientist

Deborah A. Joseph is an American computer scientist known for her research in computational geometry, computational biology, and computational complexity theory. She is a professor emeritus of computer science at the University of Wisconsin–Madison.

== Education and career ==
Joseph graduated from Hiram College in 1976 with an interdisciplinary major in ecology. She earned her Ph.D. in 1981 at Purdue University. Her dissertation, On the Power of Formal Systems for Analyzing Linear and Polynomial Time Program Behavior, was supervised by Paul R. Young.

At Wisconsin, Joseph was a recipient of the Presidential Young Investigator Award of the National Science Foundation. She was also an active member of the Computer Science and Telecommunications Board of the National Research Council.

== Selected publications ==
- Joseph, Deborah; Young, Paul (1985), "Some remarks on witness functions for nonpolynomial and noncomplete sets in NP", Theoretical Computer Science, 39 (2–3): 225–237, doi:10.1016/0304-3975(85)90140-9, MR 0821203. This paper introduces the k-creative sets, which form a potential counterexample to the Berman–Hartmanis conjecture.
- Hopcroft, John; Joseph, Deborah; Whitesides, Sue (1985), "On the movement of robot arms in 2-dimensional bounded regions", SIAM Journal on Computing, 14 (2): 315–333, doi:10.1137/0214025, MR 0784740, S2CID 16477060. Expanded version of a paper from the 23rd Symposium on Foundations of Computer Science (FOCS 1982).
- Joseph, Deborah; Meidânis, João; Tiwari, Prasoon (1992), "Determining DNA sequence similarity using maximum independent set algorithms for interval graphs", Algorithm Theory — SWAT '92: Third Scandinavian Workshop on Algorithm Theory, Helsinki, Finland, July 8–10, 1992, Proceedings, Lecture Notes in Computer Science, vol. 621, Berlin: Springer, pp. 326–337, doi:10.1007/3-540-55706-7_29, ISBN 978-3-540-55706-7, MR 1249510.
- Althöfer, Ingo; Das, Gautam; Dobkin, David; Joseph, Deborah; Soares, José (1993), "On sparse spanners of weighted graphs", Discrete & Computational Geometry, 9 (1): 81–100, doi:10.1007/BF02189308, MR 1184695. Expanded version of a paper from the 2nd Scandinavian Workshop on Algorithm Theory (SWAT 1990) and the PhD thesis of Joseph's student Gautam Das, in which they discover greedy geometric spanners.
