= Althofer =

Althofer or Althöfer is a German surname. Notable people with the surname include:

- George Althofer (1903–1993), Australian botanist, nurseryman, author, and poet
- Hedda Althofer, fictional character in German television series Samt und Seide
- Ingo Althöfer (born 1961), German mathematician
