= Juris Hartmanis =

American computer scientist (1928–2022)

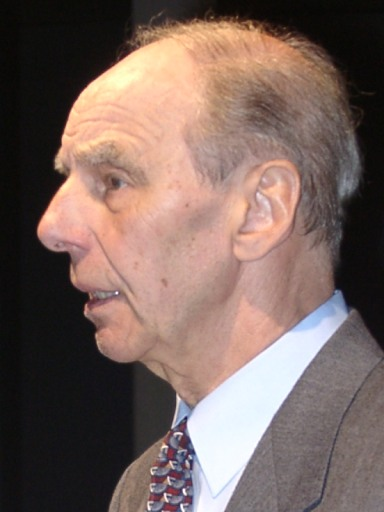
- Born: July 5, 1928; Riga, Latvia
- Died: July 29, 2022 (aged 94)
- Education: University of Marburg (BS, MS); University of Missouri, Kansas City (MS); California Institute of Technology (PhD)
- Awards: Turing Award (1993)
- Scientific career
- Fields: Computer science
- Workplaces: General Electric; Cornell University; Ohio State University
- Doctoral advisor: Robert P. Dilworth
- Doctoral students: Allan Borodin (1969); Dexter Kozen (1977); Neil Immerman (1980); Jin-Yi Cai (1986)

Juris Hartmanis (July 5, 1928 – July 29, 2022) was a Latvian-born American computer scientist and computational theorist who, with Richard E. Stearns, received the 1993 ACM Turing Award "in recognition of their seminal paper which established the foundations for the field of computational complexity theory".

== Life and career ==
Hartmanis was born in Latvia on July 5, 1928. He was a son of Mārtiņš Hartmanis, a general in the Latvian Army, and Irma Marija Hartmane. He was the younger brother of the poet Astrid Ivask. After the Soviet Union occupied Latvia in 1940, Mārtiņš Hartmanis was arrested by the Soviets and died in prison. Later in World War II, the wife and children of Mārtiņš Hartmanis left Latvia in 1944 as refugees, fearing for their safety if the Soviet Union took over Latvia again. (Note: In two of the interviews cited in section #Interviews, Hartmanis talks in detail of this period of his life, in which his father was given an estate, Lestene; the Russians occupied Latvia, took his father away, and confiscated Lestene; the Germans took over once more and restored part of Lestene to his family; and the family left Latvia for Germany before the Russians invaded Latvia again.)

They first moved to Germany, where Juris Hartmanis received the equivalent of a master's degree in physics from the University of Marburg. He then moved to the United States, where in 1951 he received a master's degree in applied mathematics at the University of Kansas City (now known as the University of Missouri–Kansas City) and in 1955 a Ph.D. in mathematics from Caltech under the supervision of Robert P. Dilworth. The University of Missouri–Kansas City honored him with an Honorary Doctor of Humane Letters in May 1999. After teaching mathematics at Cornell University and Ohio State University, Hartmanis joined the General Electric Research Laboratory in 1958. While at General Electric, he developed many principles of computational complexity theory. (Note: These early papers developed many principles of computational complexity theory. Hartmanis's 1981 survey paper provides extensive information on the work in computational complexity theory.) In 1965, he became a professor at Cornell University. He was one of the founders and the first chair of its computer science department (which was one of the first computer science departments in the world). (Note: Purdue University created the first CS Department in 1962 "History of the Department". Cornell started its CS Department in 1965, "CS Dept. timeline". Archived from the original on December 3, 2014. as did Stanford, "CS Dept. timeline". Archived from the original on February 17, 2020., Carnegie Mellon, "CS Dept. history". and a few others.)

Hartmanis contributed to national efforts to advance computer science and engineering (CS&E) in many ways. Most significantly, he chaired the National Research Council study that resulted in the 1992 publication Computing the Future – A Broad Agenda for Computer Science and Engineering, which made recommendations based on its priorities to sustain the core effort in CS&E, to broaden the field, and to improve undergrad education in CS&E. He was assistant director of the National Science Foundation (NSF) Directorate of Computer and Information Science and Engineering (CISE) from 1996 to 1998.

In 1989, Hartmanis was elected as a member into the National Academy of Engineering for fundamental contributions to computational complexity theory and to research and education in computing. He was a Fellow of the Association for Computing Machinery and of the American Mathematical Society, also a member of the National Academy of Sciences. He was also a foreign member of the Latvian Academy of Sciences, which bestowed him their Grand Medal in 2001 for his contributions to computer science.

Hartmanis died on July 29, 2022.

== Computational complexity: foundational contributions ==
In 1993, Hartmanis and R.E. Stearns received the highest prize in computer science, the Turing Award. The citation reads, "In recognition of their seminal paper which established the foundations for the field of computational complexity theory." Their paper defined the foundational notion of a Complexity class, a way of classifying computational problems according to the time required to solve them. They went on to prove a number of fundamental results such as the Time hierarchy theorem. In his own Turing Award lecture, Richard M. Karp remarks that "[I]t is the 1965 paper by Juris Hartmanis and Richard Stearns that marks the beginning of the modern era of complexity theory." (Note: See page 103 of his lecture: Karp, Richard M. (February 1986). "Combinatorics, complexity, and randomness". Communications of the ACM. 29 (2): 98–109. doi:10.1145/5657.5658. ISSN 0001-0782.)

With P.M. Lewis II, Hartmanis and Stearns also defined complexity classes based on space usage. They proved the first space hierarchy theorem. In the same year they also proved that every context-free language has deterministic space complexity (log n)^{2}, which contained the essential idea that led to Savitch's theorem on space complexity.

Hartmanis continued to make significant contributions to the field of computational complexity for decades. With Leonard Berman, he proved that all natural NP-complete languages are polynomial-time isomorphic and conjectured that this holds for all NP-complete sets. (Note: Berman–Hartmanis conjecture) Although the conjecture itself remains open, it has led to a large body of research on the structure of NP-complete sets, culminating in Mahaney's theorem on the nonexistence of sparse NP-complete sets. (Note: Sparse language) (Note: Mahaney's theorem) He and his coauthors also defined the Boolean hierarchy.

Hartmanis's 1981 article gives a personal account of developments in this area and in automata theory and discusses the underlying beliefs and philosophy that guided his research. The book written in honor of his 60th birthday, in particular, the chapter by Stearns, is a valuable resource on computational complexity.

In the late 1980s, Hartmanis's exposition on a newly discovered letter dated 20 March 1956 from Gödel to von Neumann brought fresh insight into the early history of computational complexity before his landmark paper with Stearns, touching on interactions among Turing, Gödel, Church, Post, and Kleene. Gödel, in this letter, was the first to question whether a problem equivalent to an NP-complete problem could be solved in quadratic or linear time, presaging the P = NP? question.

== Awards ==
- Fellow, American Association for the Advancement of Science (AAAS), 1981
- Member, National Academy of Engineering, 1989
- Member (foreign): Latvian Academy of Sciences, 1990
- Member, American Academy of Arts and Sciences, 1992
- ACM Turing Award 1993
- Humboldt Foundation Research Award, 1993
- Charter Fellow, ACM, 1994
- Honorary Doctor of Humane Letters, 1999
- Computing Research Association (CRA) Distinguished Service Award, 2000
- Grand Medal of the Latvian Academy of Sciences, 2001
- ACM Distinguished Service Award, 2013
- Inaugural Fellow, American Mathematical Society, 2013
- Member, National Academy of Sciences, 2013

== Selected publications ==
Books

- Algebraic Structure Theory of Sequential Machines 1966 (with R.E. Stearns)
- Feasible Computations and Provable Complexity Properties 1978
- Computational Complexity Theory (ed.) 1989
- Computing the Future: A broader agenda for computer science and engineering (ed.) 1992 (with Herbert Lin)

Selected articles

- "Computational complexity of recursive sequences" 1964 (with R.E. Stearns)
- "Classifications of computations by time and memory requirements" 1965 (with P.M. Lewis and R.E. Stearns)
- "Hierarchies of memory limited computations" 1965 (with P.M. Lewis and R.E. Stearns)
- "On the computational complexity of algorithms" 1965 (with R.E. Stearns)
- Memory bounds for recognition of context-free and context-sensitive languages 1965 (with P.M. Lewis and R.E. Stearns)
- "On isomorphisms and density of NP and other complete sets" 1977 (with L. Berman)
- "Observations about the development of theoretical computer science" 1981
- "Gödel, von Neumann, and the P =? NP problem" 1989

== Interviews ==
Juris Hartmanis has been interviewed four times. Videos are available for two of them. The most far-reaching one is by William Aspray.

- William Aspray interviews Hartmanis for the ACM Oral History interviews, 2009
- David Gries interviews Hartmanis for the Cornell ecommons collection, 2010
- Len Shustek interviews Hartmanis in an article in Communications of the ACM, 2015
- David Gries interviews Hartmanis as ACM Turing Award recipient, 2018
