= EinStein würfelt nicht! =

Board game designed by Ingo Althöfer

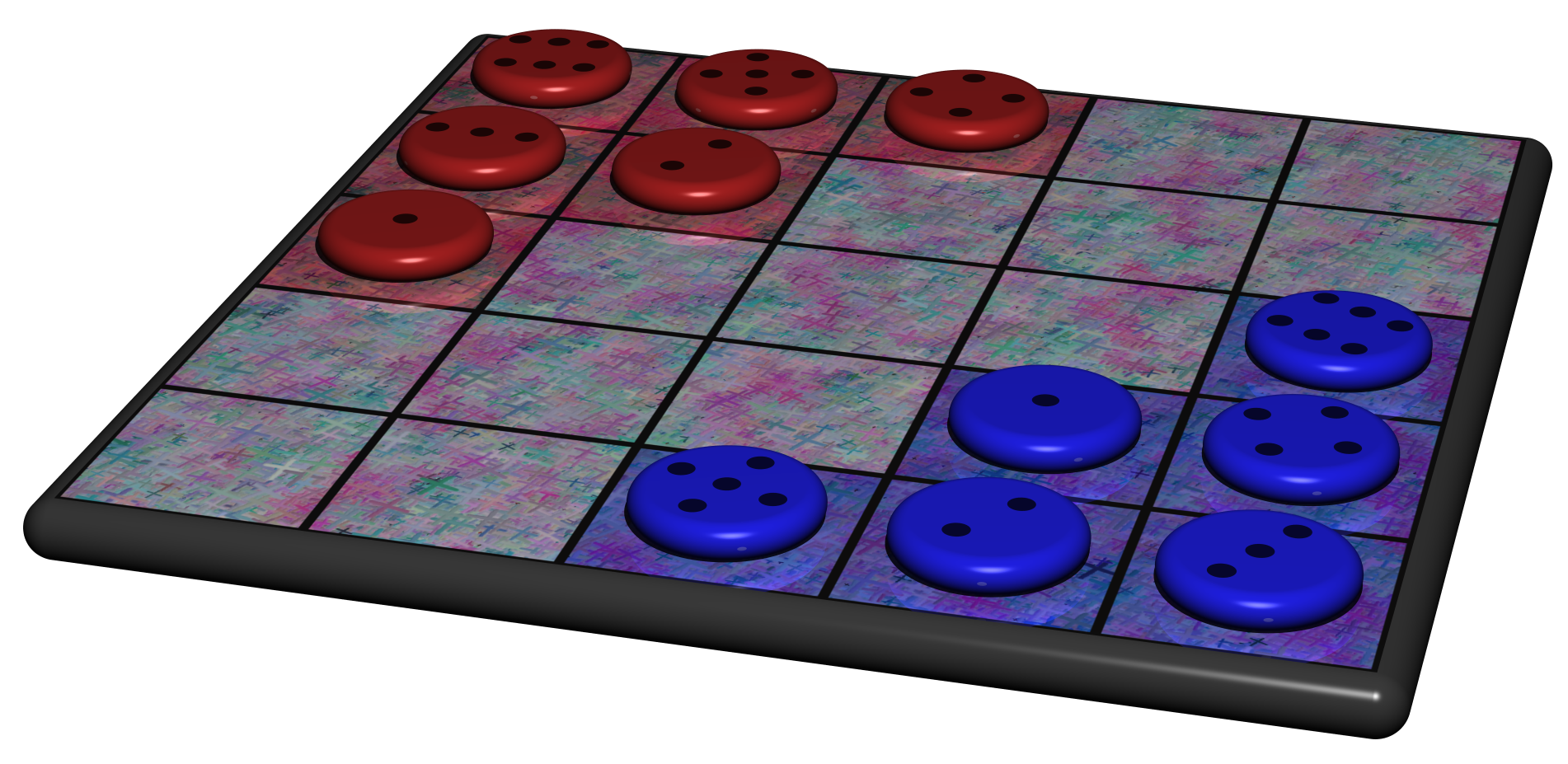
EinStein würfelt nicht 3D

EinStein würfelt nicht! (Einstein/"OneStone" does not play dice) is a board game, designed by Ingo Althöfer, a professor of applied mathematics in Jena, Germany. It was the official game of an exhibition about Albert Einstein in Germany during the Einstein Year (2005).

The name of the game in German has a double meaning. It is a play on Einstein's famous quote "I am convinced that He (God) does not play dice" and also refers to the fact that when a player has only one cube (ein Stein) remaining, they no longer need to "play dice", and may simply move the cube.

== Rules ==
The starting board

The game is played on a square board with a 5×5 grid. Each player has six cubes, numbered one to six. During setup, players arrange the cubes within the triangular area of their own color.

The players take turns rolling a six-sided die and then moving the matching cube. If the matching cube is no longer on the board, the player moves a remaining cube whose number is next-higher or next-lower to the rolled number. The player starting in the top-left may move that cube one square to the right, down, or on the diagonal down and to the right; the player starting in the bottom-right may move that cube one square to the left, up, or on the diagonal up and to the left. Any cube which already lies in the target square is removed from the board.

The objective of the game is for a player to either get one of their cubes to the far corner square in the grid (where their opponent started) or to remove all of their opponent's cubes from the board.

== Strategy ==
The fewer cubes a player has, the "more mobile" those cubes are, since more die rolls can result in moving the same piece. Therefore, it can be helpful to aim to remove one's own cubes in order to be able to move them with a higher individual probability than having multiple cubes remaining.

=== Schwarz tables ===
The "mobility" of pieces given the removal of one or more pieces can be quantified with probability. The Schwarz score of a set of pieces on the board is defined as the expected number of remaining moves, assuming no capturing takes place, for one of the pieces to reach its goal. In general, players should minimize the Schwarz score of their pieces and maximize the Schwarz score of their opponent's pieces. As there are six pieces, and each piece can be 1, 2, 3, or 4 moves away from their goal, or out of play, there are 15,625 distinct situations in which Schwarz scores can be precomputed.

== Variants ==
The game can also be played on a 6 × 6 board with ten pieces on each side, labeled 2, 3, 4, 5, 6, 8, 9, 10, 11, and 12. A pair of 6-sided dice are rolled. The game can also be played in rounds with a doubling cube as in backgammon.

== See also ==
- World Year of Physics 2005
- 16th Computer Olympiad
