= Gautam Das (computer scientist) =

Indian computer scientist

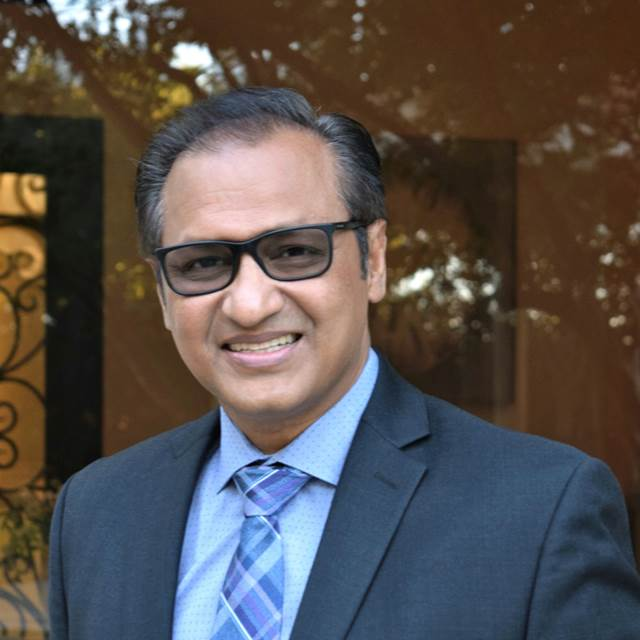
- Education: University of Wisconsin, Madison; Indian Institute of Technology, Kanpur
- Known for: Databases; Data Mining; Computational Geometry; Algorithms; Data Exploration
- Awards: ACM Fellow; IEEE Fellow
- Scientific career
- Fields: Computer Science
- Workplaces: Microsoft Research; Compaq; IBM Research; University of Memphis; University of Texas at Arlington
- Thesis: Approximation Schemes in Computational Geometry (1990)
- Doctoral advisor: Deborah A. Joseph
- Website: ranger.uta.edu/~gdas

Gautam Das is a computer scientist in the field of databases research. He is an ACM Fellow (since 2021), IEEE Fellow (since 2020), as well as an AAIA Fellow.

He is a Distinguished University Chair Professor of Computer Science and Engineering, Associate Dean of Research of College of Engineering at the University of Texas at Arlington, and director of the Database Exploration Laboratory (DBXLAB) at the CSE department at UTA. His is known for his work in databases, data mining, computational geometry, data exploration, and algorithms.

== Biography ==
He graduated with a B.Tech. in computer science from IIT Kanpur, India, and with a Ph.D. in computer science from the University of Wisconsin, Madison. Prior to joining UTA in 2004, Das has held positions at Microsoft Research, IBM Research, Compaq and the University of Memphis.

== Research ==
Das's early research interests were in computational geometry and graph algorithms. His Ph.D. dissertation made several significant contributions, most notably the discovery of greedy graph spanners. Greedy spanners – for general weighted graphs as well as in the geometric setting – have been continuously and extensively studied ever since, and have been shown to be almost as good as any other graph spanner in both lightness and edge sparsity.

In the subsequent decades, his research interests broadened to all aspects of Big Data Exploration, including data management, data analytics, machine learning and data mining. He contributed to early research on the intersection of databases and information retrieval, in particular keyword search (e.g., the DBXplorer system) and ranked retrieval in database systems. Other highlights of his research have been in time series mining, approximate query processing, and Deep Web analytics. He is presently working on areas such as machine learning approaches for approximate query processing, and fairness and explainability in data management systems.

His work has received several awards, including the Communications of ACM Research Highlight in 2021, Research Highlight Award of SIGMOD 2019, ACM SIGKDD Doctoral Dissertation Award (honorable mention) in 2014 (for his student), IEEE ICDE 10-Year Influential Paper award received in 2012, and numerous other awards.

Gautam Das has been on the editorial board of the journals ACM TODS and IEEE TKDE. He has served in the organization roles of several major conferences, including as General Chair of ACM SIGMOD/PODS 2018.

== See also ==
- Geometric spanner
- Greedy geometric spanner
