= Schröder–Bernstein theorems for operator algebras =

The Schröder–Bernstein theorem from set theory has analogs in the context of operator algebras. This article discusses such operator-algebraic results.

== For von Neumann algebras ==
Suppose M is a von Neumann algebra and E, F are projections in M. Let ~ denote the Murray-von Neumann equivalence relation on M. Define a partial order « on the family of projections by E « F if E ~ F' ≤ F. In other words, E « F if there exists a partial isometry U ∈ M such that U*U = E and UU* ≤ F.

For closed subspaces M and N where projections P_{M} and P_{N}, onto M and N respectively, are elements of M, M « N if P_{M} « P_{N}.

The Schröder–Bernstein theorem states that if M « N and N « M, then M ~ N.

A proof, one that is similar to a set-theoretic argument, can be sketched as follows. Colloquially, N « M means that N can be isometrically embedded in M. So

$$M = M_0 \supset N_0$$

where N_{0} is an isometric copy of N in M. By assumption, it is also true that, N, therefore N_{0}, contains an isometric copy M_{1} of M. Therefore, one can write

$$M = M_0 \supset N_0 \supset M_1.$$

By induction,

$$M = M_0 \supset N_0 \supset M_1 \supset N_1 \supset M_2 \supset N_2 \supset \cdots .$$

It is clear that

$$R = \cap_{i \geq 0} M_i = \cap_{i \geq 0} N_i.$$

Let

$$M \ominus N \stackrel{\mathrm{def}}{=} M \cap (N)^{\perp}.$$

So

$$M = \oplus_{i \geq 0} ( M_i \ominus N_i ) \quad \oplus \quad \oplus_{j \geq 0} ( N_j \ominus M_{j+1}) \quad \oplus R$$

and

$$N_0 = \oplus_{i \geq 1} ( M_i \ominus N_i ) \quad \oplus \quad \oplus_{j \geq 0} ( N_j \ominus M_{j+1}) \quad \oplus R.$$

Notice

$$M_i \ominus N_i \sim M \ominus N \quad \mbox{for all} \quad i.$$

The theorem now follows from the countable additivity of ~.

== Representations of C*-algebras ==
There is also an analog of Schröder–Bernstein for representations of C*-algebras. If A is a C*-algebra, a representation of A is a *-homomorphism φ from A into L(H), the bounded operators on some Hilbert space H.

If there exists a projection P in L(H) where P φ(a) = φ(a) P for every a in A, then a subrepresentation σ of φ can be defined in a natural way: σ(a) is φ(a) restricted to the range of P. So φ then can be expressed as a direct sum of two subrepresentations φ = φ' ⊕ σ.

Two representations φ_{1} and φ_{2}, on H_{1} and H_{2} respectively, are said to be unitarily equivalent if there exists a unitary operator U: H_{2} → H_{1} such that φ_{1}(a)U = Uφ_{2}(a), for every a.

In this setting, the Schröder–Bernstein theorem reads:

If two representations ρ and σ, on Hilbert spaces H and G respectively, are each unitarily equivalent to a subrepresentation of the other, then they are unitarily equivalent.

A proof that resembles the previous argument can be outlined. The assumption implies that there exist surjective partial isometries from H to G and from G to H. Fix two such partial isometries for the argument. One has

$$\rho = \rho_1 \simeq \rho_1 ' \oplus \sigma_1 \quad \mbox{where} \quad \sigma_1 \simeq \sigma.$$

In turn,

$$\rho_1 \simeq \rho_1 ' \oplus (\sigma_1 ' \oplus \rho_2) \quad \mbox{where} \quad \rho_2 \simeq \rho .$$

By induction,

$$\rho_1 \simeq \rho_1 ' \oplus \sigma_1 ' \oplus \rho_2' \oplus \sigma_2 ' \cdots \simeq ( \oplus_{i \geq 1} \rho_i ' ) \oplus
( \oplus_{i \geq 1} \sigma_i '),$$

and

$$\sigma_1 \simeq \sigma_1 ' \oplus \rho_2' \oplus \sigma_2 ' \cdots \simeq ( \oplus_{i \geq 2} \rho_i ' ) \oplus
( \oplus_{i \geq 1} \sigma_i ').$$

Now each additional summand in the direct sum expression is obtained using one of the two fixed partial isometries, so

$$\rho_i ' \simeq \rho_j ' \quad \mbox{and} \quad \sigma_i ' \simeq \sigma_j ' \quad \mbox{for all} \quad i,j \;.$$

This proves the theorem.

== See also ==
- Schröder–Bernstein theorem for measurable spaces
- Schröder–Bernstein property
