= Schröder–Bernstein property =

Mathematical property

A Schröder–Bernstein property is any mathematical property that matches the following pattern:

If, for some mathematical objects X and Y, both X is similar to a part of Y and Y is similar to a part of X, then X and Y are similar (to each other).

The name Schröder–Bernstein (or Cantor–Schröder–Bernstein, or Cantor–Bernstein) property is in analogy to the theorem of the same name (from set theory).

== Schröder–Bernstein properties ==
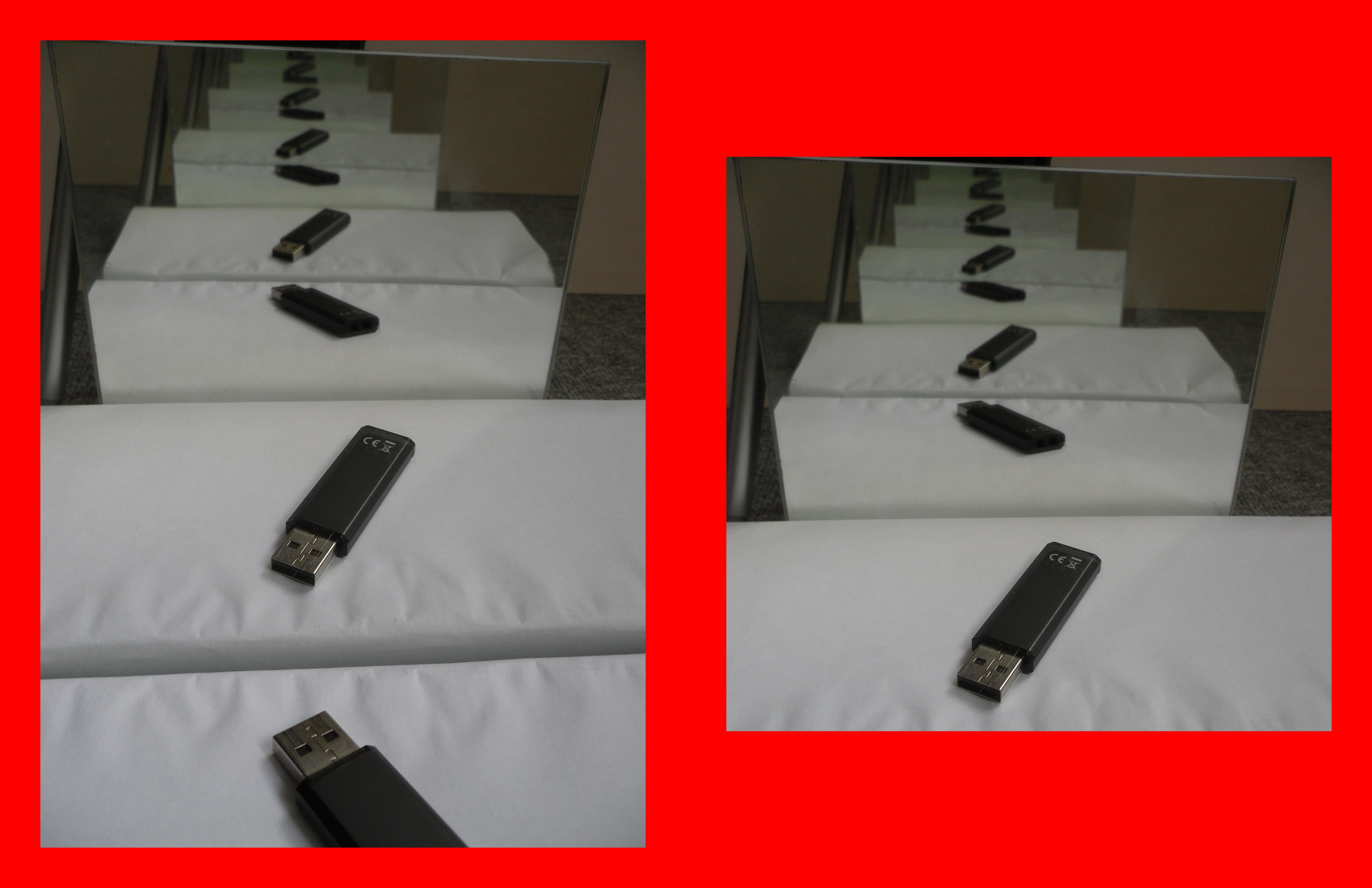
Mirror-in-mirror images as counterexample: The left image can be embedded into the right one and vice versa (below, left/mid); yet, both aren't similar. The Schröder-Bernstein theorem applied to the unstructured pixel sets obtains a non-continuous bijection (right).

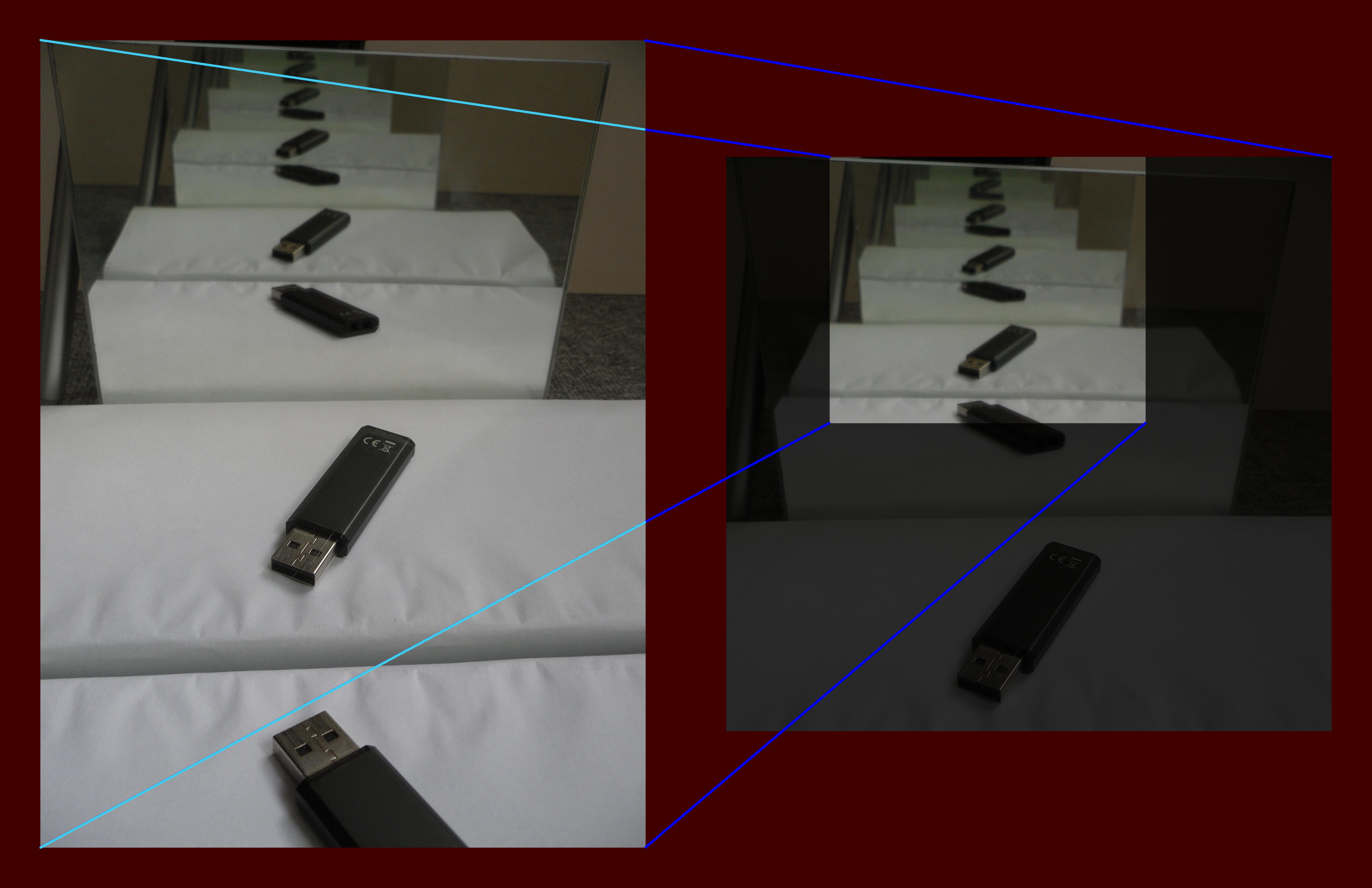

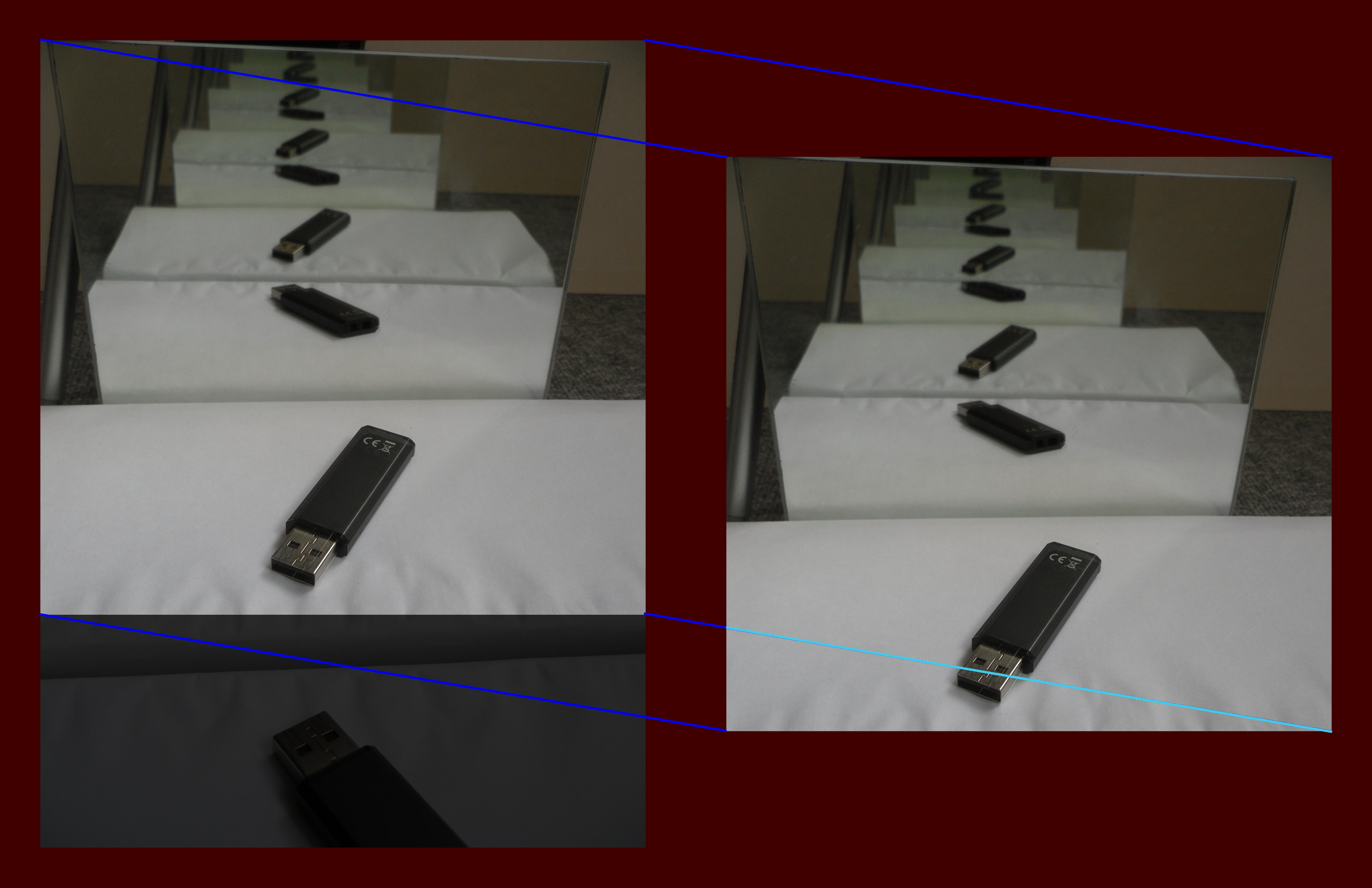

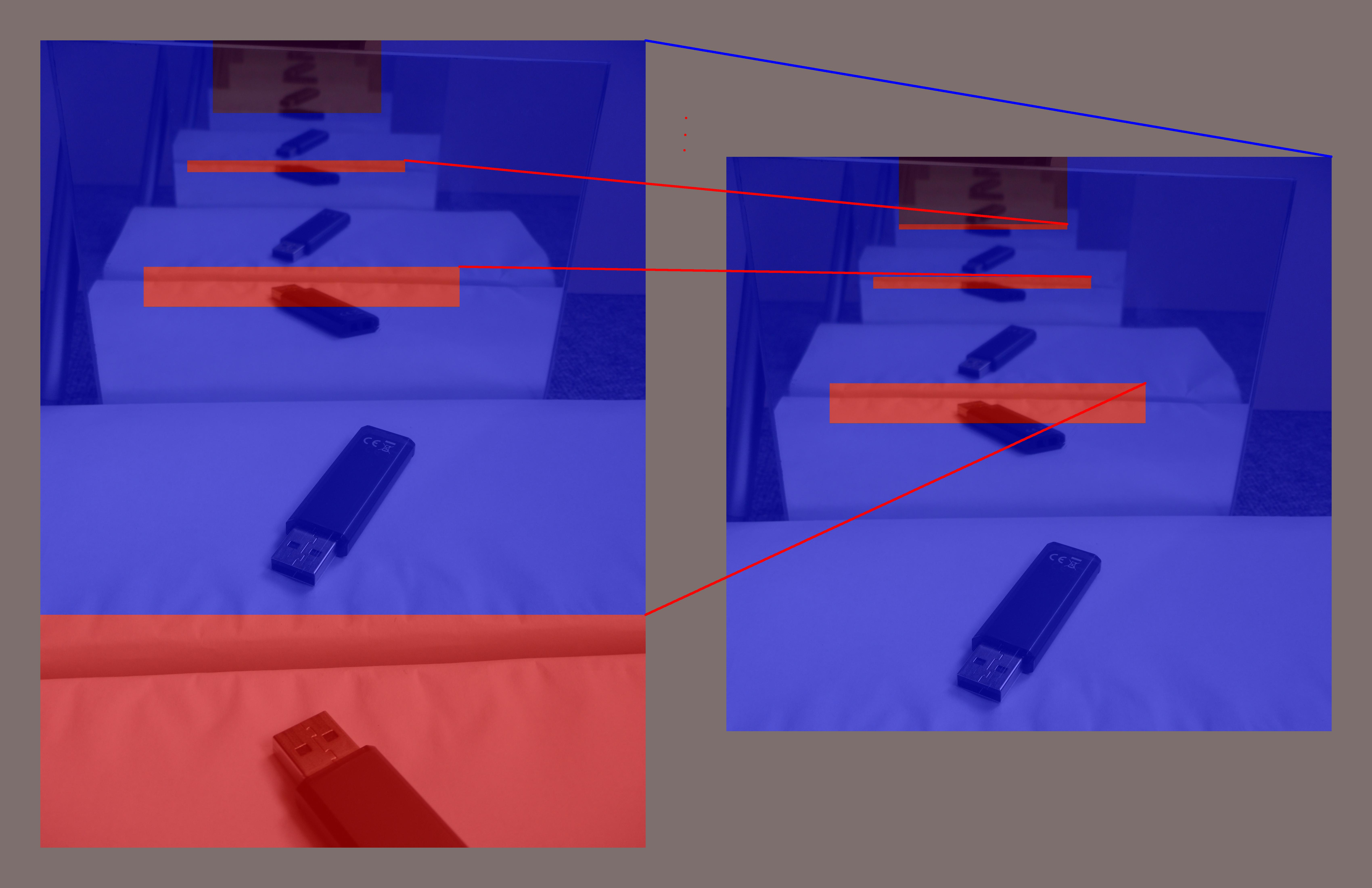

In order to define a specific Schröder–Bernstein property one should decide:

- What kind of mathematical objects are X and Y,
- What is meant by "a part",
- What is meant by "similar".

In the classical (Cantor–)Schröder–Bernstein theorem:

- Objects are sets (maybe infinite),
- "A part" is interpreted as a subset,
- "Similar" is interpreted as equinumerous.

Not all statements of this form are true. For example, assume that:

- Objects are triangles,
- "A part" means a triangle inside the given triangle,
- "Similar" is interpreted as usual in elementary geometry: triangles related by a dilation (in other words, "triangles with the same shape up to a scale factor", or equivalently "triangles with the same angles").

Then the statement fails badly: every triangle X evidently is similar to some triangle inside Y, and the other way around; however, X and Y need not be similar.

A Schröder–Bernstein property is a joint property of:

- A class of objects,
- A binary relation "be a part of",
- A binary relation "be similar to" (similarity).

Instead of the relation "be a part of" one may use a binary relation "be embeddable into" (embeddability) interpreted as "be similar to some part of". Then a Schröder–Bernstein property takes the following form:

If X is embeddable into Y and Y is embeddable into X then X and Y are similar.

The same in the language of category theory:

If objects X, Y are such that X injects into Y (more formally, there exists a monomorphism from X to Y) and also Y injects into X then X and Y are isomorphic (more formally, there exists an isomorphism from X to Y).

The relation "injects into" is a preorder (that is, a reflexive and transitive relation), and "be isomorphic" is an equivalence relation. Also, embeddability is usually a preorder, and similarity is usually an equivalence relation (which is natural, but not provable in the absence of formal definitions). Generally, a preorder leads to an equivalence relation and a partial order between the corresponding equivalence classes. The Schröder–Bernstein property claims that the embeddability preorder (assuming that it is a preorder) leads to the similarity equivalence relation, and a partial order (not just preorder) between classes of similar objects.

== Schröder–Bernstein problems and Schröder–Bernstein theorems ==
The problem of deciding whether a Schröder–Bernstein property (for a given class and two relations) holds or not, is called a Schröder–Bernstein problem. A theorem that states a Schröder–Bernstein property (for a given class and two relations), thus solving the Schröder–Bernstein problem in the affirmative, is called a Schröder–Bernstein theorem (for the given class and two relations), not to be confused with the classical (Cantor–) Schröder–Bernstein theorem mentioned above.

The Schröder–Bernstein theorem for measurable spaces states the Schröder–Bernstein property for the following case:

- Objects are measurable spaces,
- "A part" is interpreted as a measurable subset treated as a measurable space,
- "Similar" is interpreted as isomorphic.

In the Schröder–Bernstein theorem for operator algebras:

- Objects are projections in a given von Neumann algebra;
- "A part" is interpreted as a subprojection (that is, E is a part of F if F – E is a projection);
- "E is similar to F" means that E and F are the initial and final projections of some partial isometry in the algebra (that is, E = V*V and F = VV* for some V in the algebra).

Taking into account that commutative von Neumann algebras are closely related to measurable spaces, one may say that the Schröder–Bernstein theorem for operator algebras is in some sense a noncommutative counterpart of the Schröder–Bernstein theorem for measurable spaces.

The Myhill isomorphism theorem can be viewed as a Schröder–Bernstein theorem in computability theory. There is also a Schröder–Bernstein theorem for Borel sets.

Banach spaces violate the Schröder–Bernstein property; here:

- Objects are Banach spaces,
- "A part" is interpreted as a subspace or a complemented subspace,
- "Similar" is interpreted as linearly homeomorphic.

Many other Schröder–Bernstein problems related to various spaces and algebraic structures (groups, rings, fields etc.) are discussed by informal groups of mathematicians (see External Links below).

== See also ==
- Commutative von Neumann algebras
