= Computable isomorphism =

In computability theory two sets $A, B$ of natural numbers are computably isomorphic or recursively isomorphic if there exists a total computable and bijective function $f \colon \N \to \N$ such that the image of $f$ restricted to $A\subseteq \N$ equals $B\subseteq \N$, i.e. $f(A) = B$.

Further, two numberings $\nu$ and $\mu$ (of the same set of objects) are called computably isomorphic if there exists a computable bijection $f$ so that $\nu = \mu \circ f$. Computably isomorphic numberings induce the same notion of computability on a set.

== Theorems ==
By the Myhill isomorphism theorem, the relation of computably isomorphic coincides with the relation of mutual one-one reducibility.
