= Felix Bernstein (mathematician) =

German mathematician (1878–1956)

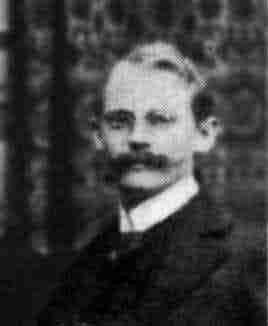
- Born: 24 February 1878; Halle
- Died: 3 December 1956 (aged 78); Zürich, Switzerland
- Education: University of Göttingen
- Known for: Property B Cantor–Bernstein theorem Schröder–Bernstein theorem
- Children: Marianne Bernstein-Wiener
- Awards: ICM Speaker (1908)
- Scientific career
- Theses: Untersuchungen aus der Mengenlehre (1901); Über den Klassenkörper eines algebraischen Zahlkörpers (1903)
- Doctoral advisor: David Hilbert

Felix Bernstein (24 February 1878 – 3 December 1956), was a German mathematician known for proving in 1896 the Schröder–Bernstein theorem, a central result in set theory, (Note: In 1897 (aged 19), according to Oliver Deiser (2010). "Zeittafel zur frühen Mengenlehre" (PDF). Einführung in die Mengenlehre — Die Mengenlehre Georg Cantors und ihre Axiomatisierung durch Ernst Zermelo (3rd ed.). Heidelberg: Springer. ISBN 978-3-540-20401-5.) and less well known for demonstrating in 1924 the correct blood group inheritance pattern of multiple alleles at one locus through statistical analysis.

== Life ==
Felix Bernstein was born in Halle on 24 February 1878 to a Jewish family of academics. His father Julius held the Chair of Physiology at the Martin Luther University of Halle-Wittenberg, and was the Director of the Physiological Institute at the University of Halle.

While still in gymnasium in Halle, Bernstein heard the university seminar of Georg Cantor, who was a friend of Bernstein's father. From 1896 to 1900, Bernstein studied at the Ludwig-Maximilians-Universität München, the University of Halle, the Friedrich Wilhelm University of Berlin, and the University of Göttingen. In the early Weimar Republic, Bernstein temporarily was Göttingen vice-chairman of the local chapter of German Democratic Party. In 1933, (Note: In 1934, according to O'Connor, Robertson (MacTutor).) after Hitler's rise to power, Bernstein was removed from his chair, per §6 of the Nazi Law for the Restoration of the Professional Civil Service, often used against politically unpopular persons. He received the message of his dismissal during a research/lecturing journey (started on Dec. 1st, 1932) to the United States, and he stayed there.

Bernstein was a visiting professor of mathematics at Columbia University from 1933 to 1936 and a professor of biometry at New York University from 1936 to 1943. In 1942, he was elected a fellow of the American Association for the Advancement of Science. In 1948, Bernstein retired from teaching in the US, and returned to Europe. He mainly lived in Rome and Freiburg, occasionally visiting Göttingen, where he became professor emeritus. He died in Zurich on 3 December 1956.

== Publications ==
- Felix Bernstein (1903). Über den Klassenkörper eines algebraischen Zahlkörpers (Habilitation thesis). Univ. Göttingen.
- Felix Bernstein (1905). "Untersuchungen aus der Mengenlehre". Mathematische Annalen. 61: 117–155. doi:10.1007/bf01457734. S2CID 119658724. Archived from the original on 2014-02-02. (Dissertation, 1901); reprint Jan 2010, ISBN 1141370263
- Felix Bernstein (1905). "Über die isoperimetrische Eigenschaft des Kreises auf der Kugeloberfläche und in der Ebene" (PDF). Mathematische Annalen. 60: 117–136. doi:10.1007/bf01447496. S2CID 121773961.
- Felix Bernstein (1905). "Über die Reihe der transfiniten Ordnungszahlen" (PDF). Mathematische Annalen. 60 (2): 187–193. doi:10.1007/bf01677265. S2CID 119726638.
- Felix Bernstein (1905). "Die Theorie der reellen Zahlen" (PDF). Jahresbericht der Deutschen Mathematiker-Vereinigung. 14: 447–449.
- Felix Bernstein (1905). "Zum Kontinuumproblem" (PDF). Mathematische Annalen. 60 (3): 463–464. doi:10.1007/bf01457626. S2CID 179177776.
- Felix Bernstein (1907). "Über das Gaußsche Fehlergesetz" (PDF). Mathematische Annalen. 64 (3): 417–448. doi:10.1007/bf01476025. S2CID 125418501.
- Felix Bernstein (1907). "Zur Theorie der trigonometrischen Reihe" (PDF). Journal für die reine und angewandte Mathematik. 132: 270–278.
- Felix Bernstein (1919). "Die Mengenlehre Georg Cantors und der Finitismus" (PDF). Jahresbericht der Deutschen Mathematiker-Vereinigung. 28: 63–78.
- Felix Bernstein (1919). "Die Übereinstimmung derjenigen beiden Summationsverfahren einer divergenten Reihe, welche von T.E. Stieltjes und E. Borel herrühren" (PDF). Jahresbericht der Deutschen Mathematiker-Vereinigung. 28: 50–63. — Corrections in Vol.29 (1920), p. 94
- Felix Bernstein (1923). "Zur Statistik der sekundären Geschlechtsmerkmale beim Menschen" (PDF). Nachrichten von der Gesellschaft der Wissenschaften zu Göttingen, Mathematisch-Physikalische Klasse. 1923: 89–95.
