= Samt und Seide =

- Country of origin: Germany

Samt und Seide is a German television series. The title song Forever and Ever was composed by Michael Hofmann De Boer

== See also ==
- List of German television series
