= Schröder–Bernstein theorem for measurable spaces =

The Cantor–Bernstein–Schroeder theorem of set theory has a counterpart for measurable spaces, sometimes called the Borel Schroeder–Bernstein theorem, since measurable spaces are also called Borel spaces. This theorem, whose proof is quite easy, is instrumental when proving that two measurable spaces are isomorphic. The general theory of standard Borel spaces contains very strong results about isomorphic measurable spaces, see Kuratowski's theorem. However, (a) the latter theorem is very difficult to prove, (b) the former theorem is satisfactory in many important cases (see Examples), and (c) the former theorem is used in the proof of the latter theorem.

== The theorem ==
Let $X$ and $Y$ be measurable spaces. If there exist injective, bimeasurable maps $f : X \to Y,$ $g : Y \to X,$ then $X$ and $Y$ are isomorphic (the Schröder–Bernstein property).

=== Comments ===
The phrase "$f$ is bimeasurable" means that, first, $f$ is measurable (that is, the preimage $f^{-1}(B)$ is measurable for every measurable $B \subset Y$), and second, the image $f(A)$ is measurable for every measurable $A \subset X$. (Thus, $f(X)$ must be a measurable subset of $Y,$ not necessarily the whole $Y.$)

An isomorphism (between two measurable spaces) is, by definition, a bimeasurable bijection. If it exists, these measurable spaces are called isomorphic.

=== Proof ===
First, one constructs a bijection $h : X \to Y$ out of $f$ and $g$ exactly as in the proof of the Cantor–Bernstein–Schroeder theorem. Second, $h$ is measurable, since it coincides with $f$ on a measurable set and with $g^{-1}$ on its complement. Similarly, $h^{-1}$ is measurable.

== Examples ==
Example maps f:(0,1)→[0,1] and g:[0,1]→(0,1).

=== Example 1 ===
The open interval (0, 1) and the closed interval [0, 1] are evidently non-isomorphic as topological spaces (that is, not homeomorphic). However, they are isomorphic as measurable spaces. Indeed, the closed interval is evidently isomorphic to a shorter closed subinterval of the open interval. Also the open interval is evidently isomorphic to a part of the closed interval (just itself, for instance).

=== Example 2 ===
The real line $\mathbb{R}$ and the plane $\mathbb{R}^2$ are isomorphic as measurable spaces. It is immediate to embed $\mathbb{R}$ into $\mathbb{R}^2.$ The converse, embedding of $\mathbb{R}^2.$ into $\mathbb{R}$ (as measurable spaces, of course, not as topological spaces) can be made by a well-known trick with interspersed digits; for example,

g(π,100e) = g(3.14159 265…, 271.82818 28…) = 20731.184218 51982 2685….

The map $g : \mathbb{R}^2 \to \mathbb{R}$ is clearly injective. It is easy to check that it is bimeasurable. (However, it is not bijective; for example, the number $1/11 = 0.090909\dots$ is not of the form $g(x,y)$).
