= Algorithmic information theory =

Subfield of information theory and computer science

Algorithmic information theory (AIT) is a branch of theoretical computer science that concerns itself with the relationship between computation and information of computably generated objects (as opposed to stochastically generated), such as strings or any other data structure. In other words, it is shown within algorithmic information theory that computational incompressibility "mimics" (except for a constant that only depends on the chosen universal programming language) the relations or inequalities found in information theory. According to Gregory Chaitin, it is "the result of putting Shannon's information theory and Turing's computability theory into a cocktail shaker and shaking vigorously."

Besides the formalization of a universal measure for irreducible information content of computably generated objects, some main achievements of AIT were to show that: in fact algorithmic complexity follows (in the self-delimited case) the same inequalities (except for a constant) that entropy does, as in classical information theory; randomness is incompressibility; and, within the realm of randomly generated software, the probability of occurrence of any data structure is of the order of the shortest program that generates it when running on a universal machine.

AIT principally studies measures of irreducible information content of strings (or other data structures). Because most mathematical objects can be described in terms of strings, or as the limit of a sequence of strings, it can be used to study a wide variety of mathematical objects, including integers. One of the main motivations behind AIT is the very study of the information carried by mathematical objects as in the field of metamathematics, e.g., as shown by the incompleteness results mentioned below. Other main motivations came from surpassing the limitations of classical information theory for single and fixed objects, formalizing the concept of randomness, and finding a meaningful probabilistic inference without prior knowledge of the probability distribution (e.g., whether it is independent and identically distributed, Markovian, or even stationary). In this way, AIT is known to be basically founded upon three main mathematical concepts and the relations between them: algorithmic complexity, algorithmic randomness, and algorithmic probability.

== Overview ==
Algorithmic information theory principally studies complexity measures on data structures—most commonly strings. Because most mathematical objects can be described in terms of strings, or as the limit of a sequence of strings, it can be used to study a wide variety of mathematical objects, including integers.

Informally, from the point of view of algorithmic information theory, the information content of a string is equivalent to the length of the most-compressed possible self-contained representation of that string. A self-contained representation is essentially a program—in some fixed but otherwise irrelevant universal programming language—that, when run, outputs the original string.

From this point of view, a 3000-page encyclopedia actually contains less information than 3000 pages of completely random letters, despite the fact that the encyclopedia is much more useful. This is because to reconstruct the entire sequence of random letters, one must know what every single letter is. On the other hand, if every vowel were removed from the encyclopedia, someone with reasonable knowledge of the English language could reconstruct it, just as one could likely reconstruct the sentence "Ths sntnc hs lw nfrmtn cntnt" from the context and consonants present.

Unlike classical information theory, algorithmic information theory gives formal, rigorous definitions of a random string and a random infinite sequence that do not depend on physical or philosophical intuitions about nondeterminism or likelihood. (The set of random strings depends on the choice of the universal Turing machine used to define Kolmogorov complexity, but any choice gives identical asymptotic results because the Kolmogorov complexity of a string is invariant up to an additive constant depending only on the choice of universal Turing machine. For this reason the set of random infinite sequences is independent of the choice of universal machine.)

Some of the results of algorithmic information theory, such as Chaitin's incompleteness theorem, appear to challenge common mathematical and philosophical intuitions. Most notable among these is the construction of Chaitin's constant Ω, a real number that expresses the probability that a self-delimiting universal Turing machine will halt when its input is supplied by flips of a fair coin (sometimes thought of as the probability that a random computer program will eventually halt). Although Ω is easily defined, in any consistent axiomatizable theory one can only compute finitely many digits of Ω, so it is in some sense unknowable, providing an absolute limit on knowledge that is reminiscent of Gödel's incompleteness theorems. Although the digits of Ω cannot be determined, many properties of Ω are known; for example, it is an algorithmically random sequence and thus its binary digits are evenly distributed (in fact it is normal).

== History ==
Algorithmic information theory was founded by Ray Solomonoff, who published the basic ideas on which the field is based as part of his invention of algorithmic probability—a way to overcome serious problems associated with the application of Bayes' rules in statistics. He first described his results at a Conference at Caltech in 1960, and in a report, February 1960, "A Preliminary Report on a General Theory of Inductive Inference." Algorithmic information theory was later developed independently by Andrey Kolmogorov, in 1965 and Gregory Chaitin, around 1966.

There are several variants of Kolmogorov complexity or algorithmic information; the most widely used one is based on self-delimiting programs and is mainly due to Leonid Levin (1974). Per Martin-Löf also contributed significantly to the information theory of infinite sequences. An axiomatic approach to algorithmic information theory based on the Blum axioms (Blum 1967) was introduced by Mark Burgin in a paper presented for publication by Andrey Kolmogorov (Burgin 1982). The axiomatic approach encompasses other approaches in the algorithmic information theory. It is possible to treat different measures of algorithmic information as particular cases of axiomatically defined measures of algorithmic information. Instead of proving similar theorems, such as the basic invariance theorem, for each particular measure, it is possible to easily deduce all such results from one corresponding theorem proved in the axiomatic setting. This is a general advantage of the axiomatic approach in mathematics. The axiomatic approach to algorithmic information theory was further developed in the book (Burgin 2005) and applied to software metrics (Burgin and Debnath, 2003; Debnath and Burgin, 2003).

== Precise definitions ==
A binary string is said to be random if the Kolmogorov complexity of the string is at least the length of the string. A simple counting argument shows that some strings of any given length are random, and almost all strings are very close to being random. Since Kolmogorov complexity depends on a fixed choice of universal Turing machine (informally, a fixed "description language" in which the "descriptions" are given), the collection of random strings does depend on the choice of fixed universal machine. Nevertheless, the collection of random strings, as a whole, has similar properties regardless of the fixed machine, so one can (and often does) talk about the properties of random strings as a group without having to first specify a universal machine.

An infinite binary sequence is said to be random if, for some constant c, for all n, the Kolmogorov complexity of the initial segment of length n of the sequence is at least n − c. It can be shown that almost every sequence (from the point of view of the standard measure—"fair coin" or Lebesgue measure—on the space of infinite binary sequences) is random. Also, since it can be shown that the Kolmogorov complexity relative to two different universal machines differs by at most a constant, the collection of random infinite sequences does not depend on the choice of universal machine (in contrast to finite strings). This definition of randomness is usually called Martin-Löf randomness, after Per Martin-Löf, to distinguish it from other similar notions of randomness. It is also sometimes called 1-randomness to distinguish it from other stronger notions of randomness (2-randomness, 3-randomness, etc.). In addition to Martin-Löf randomness concepts, there are also recursive randomness, Schnorr randomness, and Kurtz randomness etc. Yongge Wang showed that all of these randomness concepts are different.

(Related definitions can be made for alphabets other than the set $\{0,1\}$.)

== Specific sequence ==
Algorithmic information theory (AIT) is the information theory of individual objects, using computer science, and concerns itself with the relationship between computation, information, and randomness.

The information content or complexity of an object can be measured by the length of its shortest description. For instance the string

"0101010101010101010101010101010101010101010101010101010101010101"

has the short description "32 repetitions of '01'", while

"1100100001100001110111101110110011111010010000100101011110010110"

presumably has no simple description other than writing down the string itself.

More formally, the algorithmic complexity (AC) of a string x is defined as the length of the shortest program that computes or outputs x, where the program is run on some fixed reference universal computer.

A closely related notion is the probability that a universal computer outputs some string x when fed with a program chosen at random. This algorithmic "Solomonoff" probability (AP) is key in addressing the old philosophical problem of induction in a formal way.

The major drawback of AC and AP are their incomputability. Time-bounded "Levin" complexity penalizes a slow program by adding the logarithm of its running time to its length. This leads to computable variants of AC and AP, and universal "Levin" search (US) solves all inversion problems in optimal time (apart from some unrealistically large multiplicative constant).

AC and AP also allow a formal and rigorous definition of randomness of individual strings to not depend on physical or philosophical intuitions about non-determinism or likelihood. Roughly, a string is algorithmic "Martin-Löf" random (AR) if it is incompressible in the sense that its algorithmic complexity is equal to its length.

AC, AP, and AR are the core sub-disciplines of AIT, but AIT spawns into many other areas. It serves as the foundation of the Minimum Description Length (MDL) principle, can simplify proofs in computational complexity theory, has been used to define a universal similarity metric between objects, solves the Maxwell daemon problem, and many others.

== See also ==
- Algorithmic probability – Mathematical method of assigning a prior probability to a given observation
- Algorithmically random sequence – Binary sequence
- Chaitin's constant – Halting probability of a random computer program
- Computational indistinguishability – Property whereby no efficient algorithm can distinguish two distributions
- Distribution ensemble
- Epistemology – Philosophical study of knowledge
- Inductive reasoning – Method of logical reasoning
- Inductive probability – Determining the probability of future events based on past events
- Invariance theorem
- Kolmogorov complexity – Measure of algorithmic complexity
- Minimum description length – Model selection principle
- Minimum message length – Formal information theory restatement of Occam's Razor
- Pseudorandom ensemble
- Pseudorandom generator – Formal concept in theoretical computer science and cryptography
- Simplicity theory
- Shannon's source coding theorem – Establishes the limits to possible data compression
- Solomonoff's theory of inductive inference – Mathematical theory
