= Minimum message length =

Formal information theory restatement of Occam's Razor

Minimum message length (MML) is a Bayesian information-theoretic method for statistical model comparison and selection. It provides a formal information theory restatement of Occam's Razor: even when models are equal in their measure of fit-accuracy to the observed data, the one generating the most concise explanation of data is more likely to be correct (where the explanation consists of the statement of the model, followed by the lossless encoding of the data using the stated model). MML was invented by Chris Wallace, first appearing in the seminal paper "An information measure for classification". MML is intended not just as a theoretical construct, but as a technique that may be deployed in practice. It differs from the related concept of Kolmogorov complexity in that it does not require use of a Turing-complete language to model data.

== Definition ==
Shannon's A Mathematical Theory of Communication (1948) states that in an optimal code, the message length (in binary) of an event $E$, $\operatorname{length}(E)$, where $E$ has probability $P(E)$, is given by $\operatorname{length}(E) = -\log_2(P(E))$.

Bayes's theorem states that the probability of a (variable) hypothesis $H$ given fixed evidence $E$ is proportional to $P(E|H) P(H)$, which, by the definition of conditional probability, is equal to $P(H \land E)$. We want the model (hypothesis) with the highest such posterior probability. Suppose we encode a message which represents (describes) both model and data jointly. Since $\operatorname{length}(H \land E) = -\log_2(P(H \land E))$, the most probable model will have the shortest such message. The message breaks into two parts: $-\log_2(P(H \land E)) = -\log_2(P(H)) + -\log_2(P(E|H))$. The first part encodes the model itself. The second part contains information (e.g., values of parameters, or initial conditions, etc.) that, when processed by the model, outputs the observed data.

MML naturally and precisely trades model complexity for goodness of fit. A more complicated model takes longer to state (longer first part) but probably fits the data better (shorter second part). So, an MML metric won't choose a complicated model unless that model pays for itself.

== Continuous-valued parameters ==
One reason why a model might be longer would be simply because its various parameters are stated to greater precision, thus requiring transmission of more digits. Much of the power of MML derives from its handling of how accurately to state parameters in a model, and a variety of approximations that make this feasible in practice. This makes it possible to usefully compare, say, a model with many parameters imprecisely stated against a model with fewer parameters more accurately stated.

== Key features of MML ==
- MML can be used to compare models of different structure. For example, its earliest application was in finding mixture models with the optimal number of classes. Adding extra classes to a mixture model will always allow the data to be fitted to greater accuracy, but according to MML this must be weighed against the extra bits required to encode the parameters defining those classes.
- MML is a method of Bayesian model comparison. It gives every model a score.
- MML is scale-invariant and statistically invariant. Unlike many Bayesian selection methods, MML doesn't care if you change from measuring length to volume or from Cartesian co-ordinates to polar co-ordinates.
- MML is statistically consistent. For problems like the Neyman-Scott (1948) problem or factor analysis where the amount of data per parameter is bounded above, MML can estimate all parameters with statistical consistency.
- MML accounts for the precision of measurement. It uses the Fisher information (in the Wallace-Freeman 1987 approximation, or other hyper-volumes in other approximations) to optimally discretize continuous parameters. Therefore the posterior is always a probability, not a probability density.
- MML has been in use since 1968. MML coding schemes have been developed for several distributions, and many kinds of machine learners including unsupervised classification, decision trees and graphs, DNA sequences, Bayesian networks, neural networks (one-layer only so far), image compression, image and function segmentation, etc.

== See also ==
- Algorithmic probability
- Algorithmic information theory
- Grammar induction
- Inductive inference
- Inductive probability
- Kolmogorov complexity – absolute complexity (within a constant, depending on the particular choice of Universal Turing Machine); MML is typically a computable approximation (see)
- Minimum description length – an alternative with a possibly different (non-Bayesian) motivation, developed 10 years after MML.
- Occam's razor
