= Invariance theorem =

Invariance theorem may refer to:

- Invariance of domain, a theorem in topology
- A theorem pertaining to Kolmogorov complexity
- A result in classical mechanics for adiabatic invariants
- A theorem of algorithmic probability

== See also ==
- Invariant (mathematics)
