= Gregory Chaitin =

Argentine-American mathematician

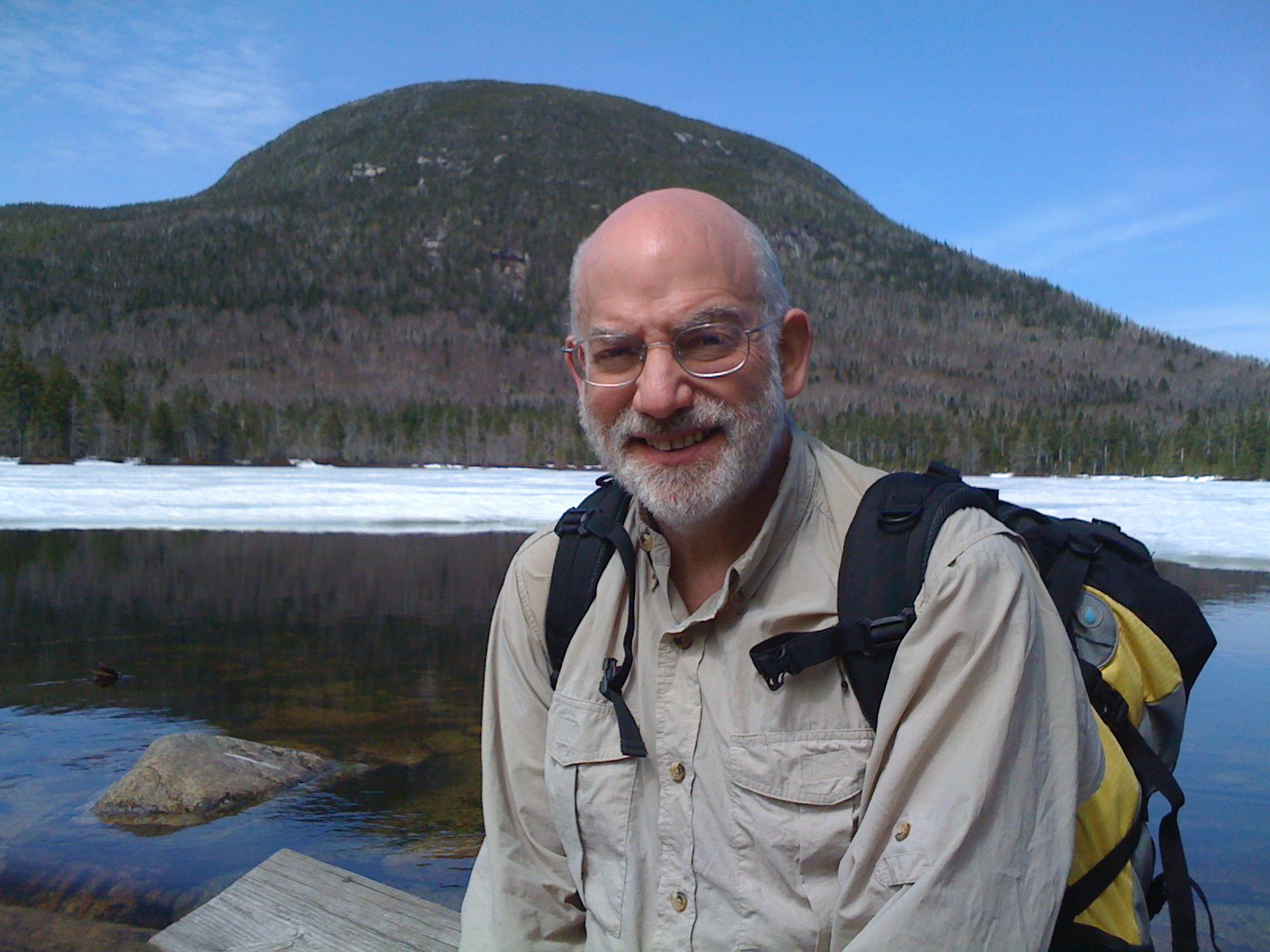
- Chaitin in 2008
- Born: 25 June 1947 (age 79); Chicago
- Known for: Algorithmic information theory; Chaitin's constant; Chaitin's algorithm
- Scientific career
- Fields: Biology; Mathematics; Computer science
- Workplaces: Mohammed VI Polytechnic University; Federal University of Rio de Janeiro; University of Buenos Aires; IBM T.J. Watson Research Center

Gregory John Chaitin (/ˈtʃaɪtɪn/ CHY-tin; born 25 June 1947) is an Argentine-American mathematician and computer scientist. His work was foundational to the development of algorithmic information theory, and has been influential on metamathematics. He independently discovered what is today known as algorithmic (or Kolmogorov, or Solomonoff–Kolmogorov–Chaitin) complexity simultaneously with Andrei Kolmogorov and Ray Solomonoff.

== Mathematics and computer science ==
Gregory Chaitin is Jewish. He attended the Bronx High School of Science and the City College of New York, where he (still in his teens) developed the theory that led to his independent discovery of algorithmic complexity.

In 1975, Chaitin defined Chaitin's constant Ω, a real number whose digits are equidistributed and which is sometimes informally described as an expression of the probability that a random program will halt. Ω has the mathematical property that it is definable, with asymptotic approximations from below (but not from above), but not computable.

Chaitin is also the originator of using graph coloring to do register allocation in compiling, a process known as Chaitin's algorithm.

He was formerly a researcher at IBM's Thomas J. Watson Research Center in New York, where he wrote more than 10 books that have been translated into about 15 languages.

Afterwards Chaitin became interested in questions of metabiology and information-theoretic formalizations of the theory of evolution, and he was one of the founding members of the Institute for Advanced Studies at Mohammed VI Polytechnic University in Morocco.

== Other scholarly contributions ==
Chaitin also writes about philosophy, especially metaphysics and philosophy of mathematics (particularly about epistemological matters in mathematics). In metaphysics, Chaitin claims that algorithmic information theory is the key to solving problems in the field of biology (obtaining a formal definition of 'life', its origin and evolution) and neuroscience (the problem of consciousness and the study of the mind).

In recent writings, he defends a position known as digital philosophy. In the epistemology of mathematics, he claims that his findings in mathematical logic and algorithmic information theory show there are "mathematical facts that are true for no reason, that are true by accident". Chaitin proposes that mathematicians must abandon any hope of proving those mathematical facts and adopt a quasi-empirical methodology.

== Honors ==
In 1995 he was given the degree of doctor of science honoris causa by the University of Maine. In 2002 he was given the title of honorary professor by the University of Buenos Aires in Argentina, where his parents were born and where Chaitin spent part of his youth. In 2007 he was given a Leibniz Medal by Wolfram Research; the medal was designed by Stephen Wolfram and Hector Zenil, using Chaitin’s number calculated by Cristian Calude. In 2009 he was given the degree of doctor of philosophy honoris causa by the National University of Córdoba. He was formerly a researcher at IBM's Thomas J. Watson Research Center and a professor at the Federal University of Rio de Janeiro.

== Bibliography ==
- Algorithmic Information Theory (Cambridge University Press 1987) (online)
- Information, Randomness & Incompleteness (World Scientific 1987) (online)
- Information-theoretic Incompleteness (World Scientific 1992) (online)
- The Limits of Mathematics (Springer-Verlag 1998) (online)
- The Unknowable (Springer-Verlag 1999) (online)
- Exploring Randomness (Springer-Verlag 2001)
- Conversations with a Mathematician (Springer-Verlag 2002) (online)
- From Philosophy to Program Size (Tallinn Cybernetics Institute 2003) (arXiv:math/0303352)
- Meta Math!: The Quest for Omega (Pantheon Books 2005) (reprinted in UK as Meta Maths: The Quest for Omega, Atlantic Books 2006) (arXiv:math/0404335)
- Thinking about Gödel & Turing (World Scientific 2007) (online)
- Proving Darwin: Making Biology Mathematical (Pantheon Books 2012) (online)
- The Perfect Language (Jerusalem theology talk 2015) (online online)
- A Life in Mathematics (autobiographical essay 2021) (online)
- Infinity, Incompleteness, Irreducibility (course notes 2024) (online)
