= Leonid Levin =

Soviet-American mathematician

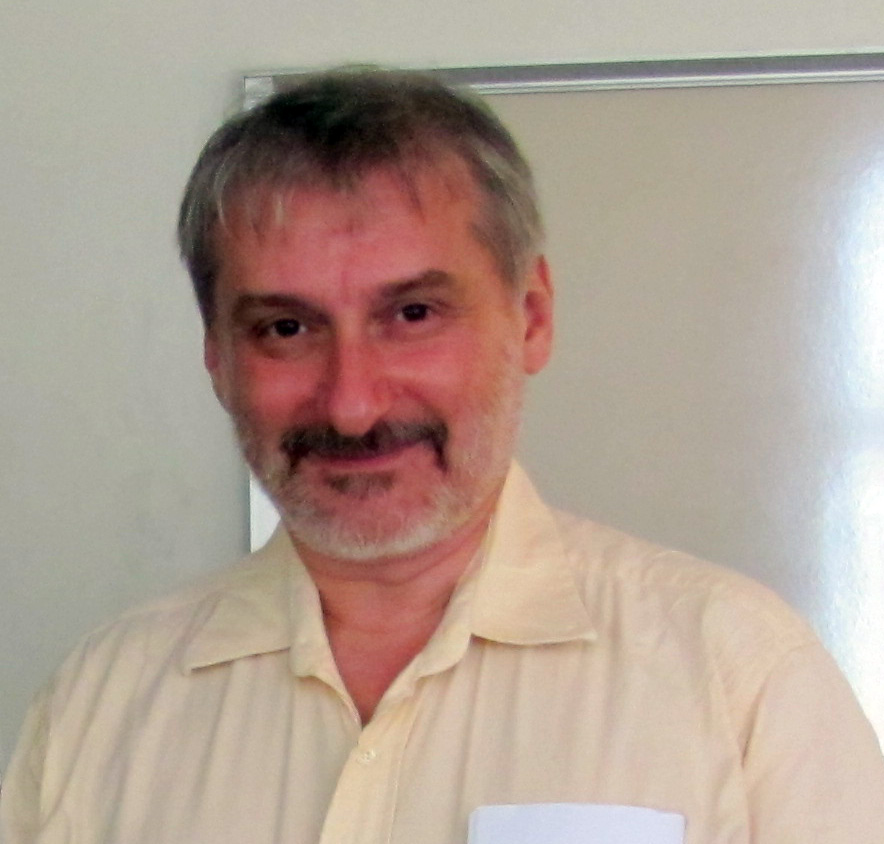
- Levin in 2010
- Born: Leonid Anatolievich Levin; November 2, 1948 (age 77); Dnipropetrovsk, Ukrainian SSR, Soviet Union
- Education: Moscow University; Massachusetts Institute of Technology
- Known for: Cook–Levin theorem Average-case complexity Research in complexity, randomness, information
- Awards: Knuth Prize (2012)
- Scientific career
- Fields: Mathematics; Computer Science
- Workplaces: Boston University
- Doctoral advisor: Andrey Kolmogorov, Albert R. Meyer

Leonid Anatolievich Levin (/ˌleɪ.oʊˈniːd ˈlɛvɪn/ LAY-oh-NEED LEV-in; Russian: Леони́д Анато́льевич Ле́вин [lʲɪɐˈnʲit ɐnɐˈtolʲjɪvʲɪtɕ ˈlʲevʲɪn]; Ukrainian: Леоні́д Анато́лійович Ле́він [leoˈn⁽ʲ⁾id ɐnɐˈtɔl⁽ʲ⁾ijowɪtʃ ˈlɛwin]; born November 2, 1948) is a Soviet-American mathematician and computer scientist.

He is known for his work in randomness in computing, algorithmic complexity and intractability, average-case complexity, foundations of mathematics and computer science, algorithmic probability, theory of computation, and information theory. He obtained his master's degree at Moscow University in 1970 where he studied under Andrey Kolmogorov and completed the Candidate Degree academic requirements in 1972.

He and Stephen Cook independently discovered the existence of NP-complete problems. This NP-completeness theorem, often called the Cook–Levin theorem, was a basis for one of the seven Millennium Prize Problems declared by the Clay Mathematics Institute with a $1,000,000 prize offered. The Cook–Levin theorem was a breakthrough in computer science and an important step in the development of the theory of computational complexity.

Levin was awarded the Knuth Prize in 2012 for his discovery of NP-completeness and the development of average-case complexity. He is a member of the US National Academy of Sciences and a fellow of the American Academy of Arts and Sciences.

== Biography ==
He obtained his master's degree at Moscow University in 1970 where he studied under Andrey Kolmogorov and completed the Candidate Degree academic requirements in 1972. After researching algorithmic problems of information theory at the Moscow Institute of Information Transmission of the National Academy of Sciences in 1972–1973, and a position as senior research scientist at the Moscow National Research Institute of Integrated Automation for the Oil/Gas Industry in 1973–1977, he emigrated to the U.S. in 1978 and also earned a Ph.D. at the Massachusetts Institute of Technology (MIT) in 1979. His advisor at MIT was Albert R. Meyer.

He is well known for his work in randomness in computing, algorithmic complexity and intractability, average-case complexity, foundations of mathematics and computer science, algorithmic probability, theory of computation, and information theory.

His life is described in a chapter of the book Out of Their Minds: The Lives and Discoveries of 15 Great Computer Scientists.

Levin and Stephen Cook independently discovered the existence of NP-complete problems. This NP-completeness theorem, often called the Cook–Levin theorem, was a basis for one of the seven Millennium Prize Problems declared by the Clay Mathematics Institute with a $1,000,000 prize offered. The Cook–Levin theorem was a breakthrough in computer science and an important step in the development of the theory of computational complexity. Levin's journal article on this theorem was published in 1973; he had lectured on the ideas in it for some years before that time (see Trakhtenbrot's survey), though complete formal writing of the results took place after Cook's publication.

Levin was awarded the Knuth Prize in 2012 for his discovery of NP-completeness and the development of average-case complexity.

He is currently a professor of computer science at Boston University, where he began teaching in 1980.
