= Hermine Agavni Kalustyan =

Turkish mathematician and politician (1914–1989)

Hermine Agavni Kalustyan (Armenian: Հերմինէ Աղաւնի Գալուստեան, 1914 – 3 September 1989) was a Turkish-Armenian mathematician, educator and politician.

== Early life and education ==
Kalustyan was born in 1914 in Istanbul, Turkey. She graduated from Paris High School Teacher Training School and from Istanbul University Mathematics Department. From 1932 to 1936, she was at Ecole Normale Superieure to study mathematics. In 1941, she became the first woman in Turkey to obtain a Ph.D. degree in mathematics. She wrote her dissertation titled "Conformal depiction and the movement of an object" in the Istanbul University under Richard von Mises and William Prager. She also translated a textbook for students, an introduction to calculus for chemistry students, written by the Austrian-Jewish mathematician Hilda Geiringer, based on lecture notes Kalustyan had compiled. Geiringer had fled Austria for Turkey for her safety during the early years of World War II.

== Career ==
After receiving her Ph.D., from 1948 to 1973, Kalustyan was the appointed principal at Esayan Armenian High School. She also taught mathematics at the Getronagan and Galatasaray lyceums in Istanbul, Turkey. In 1961, she became the republic's first non-Muslim minority woman to serve in parliament with her appointment to the transitional parliament (1960–1961) that constructed the country's 1961 Constitution. Afterwards, she became a member of the CHP on February 18, 1961.

In 1975, she published a book in Armenian titled "Towards the Past and Now: Towards Fezaya", and moved to France because the leadership of the Adalet Partisi party no longer allowed her to practice her profession as a teacher and school principal. Kalustyan considered this as a slap in the face from the state. She died in a nursing home in France and, at her own request, was buried in Istanbul.

She spoke Turkish, French, English and Armenian.

== Select publications ==
- Ali Çakırbaş (June 2017), Non-Muslim MPs and Their Activities in the Republican Era (1923-1964), Nevşehir: Nevşehir Hacı Bektaş Veli University Social Sciences Institute, p. 293, archived from the original on 12 May 2021, access date: 12 May 2021, PhD Thesis
- Nihal Esen (2016), Non-Muslim Members of Parliament in the Republican Era, Elazığ: Fırat University Social Sciences Institute, p. 47, archived from the original on 12 May 2021, access date: 12 May 2021, Master's Thesis
- Grand National Assembly of Turkey Album 1920-2010, Volume 4 (1960-1983), p. 1641, archived from the original on 21 January 2016, access date: 12 May 2021
