= Wassily Hoeffding =

American statistician (1914–1991)

- Born: June 12, 1914; Mustamäki, Grand Duchy of Finland, Russian Empire
- Died: February 28, 1991 (aged 76); Chapel Hill, North Carolina
- Education: Berlin University
- Known for: Hoeffding's inequality, Hoeffding's lemma
- Scientific career
- Fields: Statistician
- Workplaces: University of North Carolina at Chapel Hill
- Doctoral advisor: Alfred Klose
- Doctoral students: Donald Burkholder; Joan R. Rosenblatt; Nicholas Fisher; Meyer Dwass

Wassily Hoeffding (June 12, 1914 – February 28, 1991) was a Finnish-born American statistician and probabilist. Hoeffding was one of the founders of nonparametric statistics, in which Hoeffding contributed the idea and basic results on U-statistics.

In probability theory, Hoeffding's inequality provides an upper bound on the probability for the sum of random variables to deviate from its expected value.

== Personal life ==
Hoeffding was born in Mustamäki, Grand Duchy of Finland, although his place of birth is registered as St. Petersburg on his birth certificate. His father was an economist and a disciple of Peter Struve, the Russian social scientist and public figure. His paternal grandparents were Danish and his father's uncle was the Danish philosopher Harald Høffding. His mother, née Wedensky, had studied medicine. Both grandfathers had been engineers. In 1918 the family left Tsarskoye Selo for Ukraine and, after traveling through scenes of civil war, finally left Russia for Denmark in 1920, where Wassily entered school.

In 1924 the family settled in Berlin. Hoeffding obtained his PhD in 1940 at the University of Berlin. He migrated with his mother to the United States in 1946. His younger brother, Oleg, became a military historian in the United States.

Hoeffding's ashes were buried in a small cemetery on land owned by George E. Nicholson, Jr.'s family in Chatham County, NC about 11 miles south of Chapel Hill, NC.

== Work ==
In 1948, Hoeffding introduced the concept of U-statistics. In 1951, he spent time on the central limit theorem under nonstandard conditions and later proved a combinatorial central limit theorem: If (R1, … , Rn) is a random permutation of the numbers 1, 2, … , n that assumes every permutation with the same probability 1/n!, then $T_{n} = \Sigma_{j} b(j,R_{j})$ is asymptotically normal as n → ∞ under simple conditions that were later proved to be minimal. This result has turned out to be the workhorse of the asymptotic theory of rank tests that often have statistics according to the aforementioned equation or that can be approximated by such statistics.

Further details on Hoeffding's work are available in The Collected Works of Wassily Hoeffding.

== Writings ==
- Masstabinvariante Korrelationstheorie, 1940
- On the distribution of the rank correlation coefficient t when the variates are not independent in Biometrika, 1947
- A class of statistics with asymptotically normal distribution, 1948
- A nonparametric test for independence, 1948
- The central limit theorem for dependent random variables (with Herbert Robbins), 1948
- "Optimum" nonparametric tests, 1951
- A combinatorial central limit theorem, 1951
- The large-sample power of test based on permutations of observations, 1952
- On the distribution of the expected values of the order statistics, 1953
- The efficiency of tests (with J. R. Rosenblatt), 1955
- On the distribution of the number of successes in independent trials, 1956
- Distinguishability of sets of distributions. (The case of independent and identically distributed random variables.), (with Jacob Wolfowitz), 1958
- Lower bounds for the expected sample size and the average risk of a sequential procedure, 1960
- Probability inequalities for sums of bounded random variables, 1963

== See also ==
- Hoeffding's independence test
- Hoeffding's inequality
- Hoeffding's lemma
