= U-statistic =

Class of statistics in estimation theory

In statistical theory, a U-statistic is a class of statistics defined as the average over the application of a given function applied to all tuples of a fixed size. The letter "U" stands for unbiased. In elementary statistics, U-statistics arise naturally in producing minimum-variance unbiased estimators.

The theory of U-statistics allows a minimum-variance unbiased estimator to be derived from each unbiased estimator of an estimable parameter (alternatively, statistical functional) for large classes of probability distributions. An estimable parameter is a measurable function of the population's cumulative probability distribution: For example, for every probability distribution, the population median is an estimable parameter. The theory of U-statistics applies to general classes of probability distributions.

== History ==
Many statistics originally derived for particular parametric families have been recognized as U-statistics for general distributions. In non-parametric statistics, the theory of U-statistics is used to establish for statistical procedures (such as estimators and tests) and estimators relating to the asymptotic normality and to the variance (in finite samples) of such quantities. The theory has been used to study more general statistics as well as stochastic processes, such as random graphs.

Suppose that a problem involves independent and identically-distributed random variables and that estimation of a certain parameter is required. Suppose that a simple unbiased estimate can be constructed based on only a few observations: this defines the basic estimator based on a given number of observations. For example, a single observation is itself an unbiased estimate of the mean and a pair of observations can be used to derive an unbiased estimate of the variance. The U-statistic based on this estimator is defined as the average (across all combinatorial selections of the given size from the full set of observations) of the basic estimator applied to the sub-samples.

Pranab K. Sen (1992) provides a review of the paper by Wassily Hoeffding (1948), which introduced U-statistics and set out the theory relating to them, and in doing so Sen outlines the importance U-statistics have in statistical theory. Sen says, “The impact of Hoeffding (1948) is overwhelming at the present time and is very likely to continue in the years to come.” Note that the theory of U-statistics is not limited to the case of independent and identically-distributed random variables or to scalar random-variables.

== Definition ==
The term U-statistic, due to Hoeffding (1948), is defined as follows.

Let $K$ be either the real or complex numbers, and let $f\colon (K^d)^r\to K$ be a $K$-valued function of $r$ $d$-dimensional variables. For each $n\ge r$ the associated U-statistic $f_n\colon (K^d)^n \to K$ is defined to be the average of the values $f(x_{i_1}, \dotsc, x_{i_r})$ over the set $I_{r, n}$ of $r$-tuples of indices from $\{1, 2, \dotsc, n\}$ with distinct entries. Formally,

$$f_n(x_1,\dotsc, x_n) = \frac{1}{\prod_{i = 0}^{r - 1} (n - i)} \sum_{(i_1, \dotsc, i_r) \in I_{r, n}} f(x_{i_1},\dotsc, x_{i_r})$$.

In particular, if $f$ is symmetric the above is simplified to

$$f_n(x_1, \dotsc, x_n) = \frac{1}{\binom{n}{r}} \sum_{(i_1, \dotsc, i_r) \in J_{r, n}} f(x_{i_1}, \dotsc, x_{i_r})$$,

where now $J_{r, n}$ denotes the subset of $I_{r, n}$ of increasing tuples.

Each U-statistic $f_n$ is necessarily a symmetric function.

U-statistics are very natural in statistical work, particularly in Hoeffding's context of independent and identically distributed random variables, or more generally for exchangeable sequences, such as in simple random sampling from a finite population, where the defining property is termed ‘inheritance on the average’.

Fisher's k-statistics and Tukey's polykays are examples of homogeneous polynomial U-statistics (Fisher, 1929; Tukey, 1950).

For a simple random sample φ of size n taken from a population of size N, the U-statistic has the property that the average over sample values ƒ_{n}(xφ) is exactly equal to the population value ƒ_{N}(x).

== Examples ==
Some examples: If $f(x) = x$ the U-statistic $f_n(x) = \bar x_n = (x_1 + \cdots + x_n)/n$ is the sample mean.

If $f(x_1, x_2) = |x_1 - x_2|$, the U-statistic is the mean pairwise deviation $f_n(x_1,\ldots, x_n) = 2 / (n(n-1))\sum_{i> j} |x_i - x_j|$, defined for $n\ge 2$.

If $f(x_1, x_2) = (x_1 - x_2)^2/2$, the U-statistic is the sample variance $f_n(x) = \sum(x_i - \bar x_n)^2/(n-1)$ with divisor $n-1$, defined for $n\ge 2$.

The third $k$-statistic $k_{3,n}(x) = \sum(x_i - \bar x_n)^3 n/((n-1)(n-2))$, the sample skewness defined for $n\ge 3$, is a U-statistic.

The following case highlights an important point. If $f(x_1, x_2, x_3)$ is the median of three values, $f_n(x_1,\ldots, x_n)$ is not the median of $n$ values. However, it is a minimum variance unbiased estimate of the expected value of the median of three values, not the median of the population. Similar estimates play a central role where the parameters of a family of probability distributions are being estimated by probability weighted moments or L-moments.

== See also ==
- V-statistic
