= Chris Wallace (disambiguation) =

Chris Wallace (born 1947) is an American newscaster.

Chris, Christine or Christopher Wallace may also refer to:

- Chris Wallace (American football) (born 1975), American football quarterback
- Chris Wallace (basketball), American basketball executive
- Chris Wallace (computer scientist) (1933–2004), Australian computer scientist and physicist, developer of Minimum Message Length
- Chris Wallace (EastEnders), a fictional character in the British soap opera EastEnders in 2001
- Chris Wallace (entertainer), American-Australian television producer and entertainer.
- Chris Wallace (musician) (born 1982), lead vocalist for The White Tie Affair
- Christine Wallace (born 1960), Australian political journalist, biographer and academic
- Christopher Wallace, real name of The Notorious B.I.G. (1972–1997), American rapper
- Christopher Wallace, real name of Don Trip (born 1985), American rapper
- Christopher Wallace (British Army officer) (1943–2016), British Army general and trustee of the Imperial War Museum
- Christopher Jordan Wallace, full name of C. J. Wallace (born 1996), American actor, son of The Notorious B.I.G.

== See also ==
- Chris Wallace-Crabbe (1934–2025), Australian poet and professor
