= Chris Wallace (computer scientist) =

Australian computer scientist (1933–2004)

For other uses, see Chris Wallace (disambiguation).

Christopher Stewart Wallace (26 October 1933 – 7 August 2004) was an Australian computer scientist and physicist.

Wallace is notable for having devised:

- The minimum message length principle — an information-theoretic principle in statistics, econometrics, machine learning, inductive inference and knowledge discovery which can be seen both as a mathematical formalisation of Occam's Razor and as an invariant Bayesian method of model selection and point estimation,
- The Wallace tree form of binary multiplier (1964),
- a variety of random number generators,
- a theory in physics and philosophy that entropy is not the arrow of time,
- a refrigeration system (from the 1950s, whose design is still in use in 2010),
- hardware for detecting and counting cosmic rays,
- design of computer operating systems,
- the notion of universality probability in mathematical logic,
- and a vast range of other works - see, e.g., "Christopher Stewart WALLACE (1933-2004) memorial special issue". Computer Journal. 51 (5): 523–607. 5 September 2008. doi:10.1093/comjnl/bxm117. and its Foreword re C. S. Wallace , pp 523-560.

He was appointed Foundation Chair of Information Science at Monash University in 1968 at the age of 34 (before the Department was re-named Computer Science), and Professor Emeritus in 1996. Wallace was a fellow of the Australian Computer Society and in 1995 he was appointed a fellow of the ACM "For research in a number of areas in Computer Science including fast multiplication algorithm, minimum message length principle and its applications, random number generation, computer architecture, numerical solution of ODE's, and contribution to Australian Computer Science."

Wallace received his PhD (in Physics) from the University of Sydney in 1959. He was married to Judy Ogilvie, the first secretary and programme librarian of SILLIAC, which was launched on the 12 of September 1956 at the University of Sydney and which was one of Australia's first computers. He also engineered one of the world's first Local Area Networks in the mid-1960s.
