= Meyer Dwass =

American statistician

- Born: April 9, 1923; New Haven, Connecticut
- Died: July 15, 1996 (aged 73); Broadview, Illinois
- Education: University of North Carolina at Chapel Hill
- Scientific career
- Fields: Probability theory Statistics
- Workplaces: Northwestern University
- Doctoral advisor: Wassilij Höffding

Meyer Dwass (April 9, 1923 – July 15, 1996) was an American mathematical statistician known for his contributions to applied probability. Dwass was a professor of statistics at Northwestern University.

Born in New Haven, Connecticut, Dwass attended George Washington University, earning a bachelor's degree in 1948. Under supervision of Wassilij Höffding, he earned a Ph.D. from University of North Carolina at Chapel Hill in 1952.
