= Hoeffding's independence test =

Statistical measure

In statistics, Hoeffding's test of independence, named after Wassily Hoeffding, is a test based on the population measure of deviation from independence

$$H = \int (F_{12}-F_1F_2)^2 \, dF_{12}$$

where $F_{12}$ is the joint distribution function of two random variables, and $F_1$ and $F_2$ are their marginal distribution functions. Hoeffding derived an unbiased estimator of $H$ that can be used to test for independence, and is consistent for any continuous alternative. The test should only be applied to data drawn from a continuous distribution, since $H$ has a defect for discontinuous $F_{12}$, namely that it is not necessarily zero when $F_{12}=F_1F_2$. This drawback can be overcome by taking an integration with respect to $dF_1F_2$. This modified measure is known as Blum–Kiefer–Rosenblatt coefficient.

A paper published in 2008 describes both the calculation of a sample based version of this measure for use as a test statistic, and calculation of the null distribution of this test statistic.

== See also ==
- Correlation
- Kendall's tau
- Spearman's rank correlation coefficient
- Distance correlation

== Primary sources ==
- Wassily Hoeffding, A non-parametric test of independence, Annals of Mathematical Statistics 19: 293–325, 1948. (JSTOR)
- Hollander and Wolfe, Non-parametric statistical methods (Section 8.7), 1999. Wiley.
