= Mukhino, Leningrad Oblast =

Rural locality in Vyborgsky District, Russia

Coordinates: 60°16′25″N 29°31′55″E

Mukhino (Russian: Му́хино; Finnish: Mustamäki) is a rural locality on the north-eastern shore of the Roshchinka River, on Karelian Isthmus, in Vyborgsky District of Leningrad Oblast, served by the station 63rd km of the Saint Petersburg–Vyborg railroad.
