= Richard von Mises =

Austrian physicist and mathematician (1883–1953)

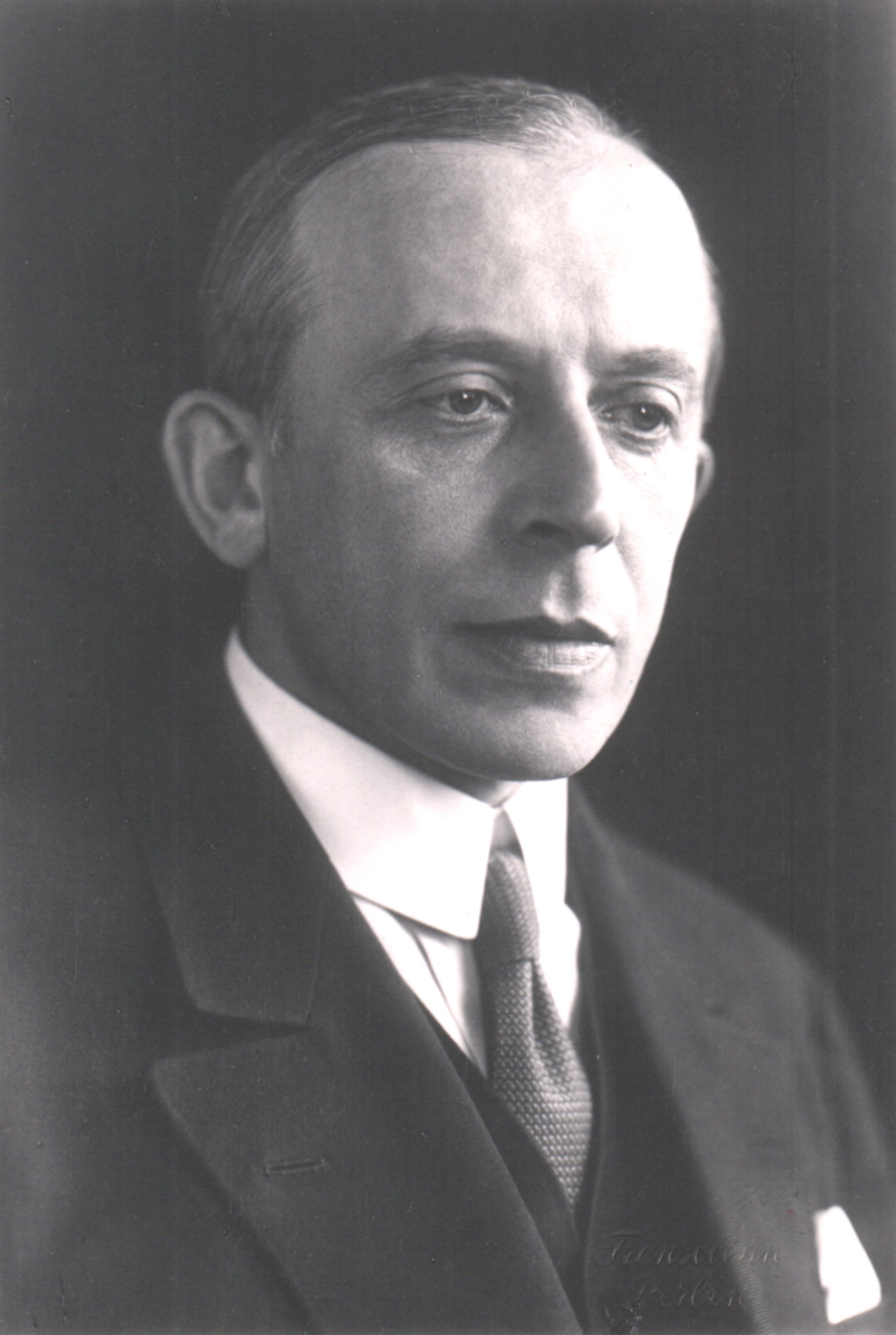
- Born: 19 April 1883; Lemberg, Austria-Hungary
- Died: 14 July 1953 (aged 70); Boston, Massachusetts, US
- Education: Vienna University of Technology
- Known for: von Mises distribution Von Mises transformation Von Mises statistic Bernstein–von Mises theorem Cramér–von Mises criterion von Mises yield criterion Von Mises–Fisher distribution Random sequence Sample space V-statistic
- Spouse: Hilda Geiringer
- Relatives: Ludwig von Mises (brother)
- Scientific career
- Fields: Solid mechanics, fluid mechanics, aerodynamics, aeronautics, statistics and probability theory
- Workplaces: Brno University of Technology; University of Strasbourg; TU Dresden; Humboldt University of Berlin; University of Istanbul; Harvard University
- Doctoral advisor: Georg Hamel
- Doctoral students: Geoffrey S. S. Ludford; Stefan Bergman; Hermine Agavni Kalustyan

Richard Martin von Mises (German: [fɔn ˈmiːzəs]; 19 April 1883 – 14 July 1953) was an Austrian scientist and mathematician who worked on solid mechanics, fluid mechanics, aerodynamics, aeronautics, statistics and probability theory. He held the position of Gordon McKay Professor of Aerodynamics and Applied Mathematics at Harvard University. He described his work in his own words shortly before his death as, "practical analysis, integral and differential equations, mechanics, hydrodynamics and aerodynamics, constructive geometry, probability calculus, statistics and philosophy".

Although best known for his mathematical work, von Mises also contributed to the philosophy of science as a neo-positivist and empiricist, following the line of Ernst Mach. Historians of the Vienna Circle of logical empiricism recognize a "first phase" from 1907 through 1914 with Philipp Frank, Hans Hahn, and Otto Neurath. His older brother, Ludwig von Mises, held an opposite point of view with respect to positivism and epistemology. His brother developed praxeology, an a priori view.

During his time in Istanbul, Mises maintained close contact with Philipp Frank, a logical positivist and Professor of Physics in Prague until 1938. His literary interests included the Austrian novelist Robert Musil and the poet Rainer Maria Rilke, on whom he became a recognized expert.

== Life ==
Richard Martin Edler von Mises was born in Lemberg, Austria-Hungary (today Lviv, Ukraine) into a Jewish family, eighteen months after his brother Ludwig von Mises, who became a prominent economist of the Austrian School, a heterodox school of economics. His parents were Arthur Edler von Mises, a doctor of technical sciences who worked for the Austrian State Railways, and Adele Landau. Richard and Ludwig had a younger brother, Karl von Mises, who died as an infant from Scarlet Fever. Richard attended the Akademisches Gymnasium in Vienna, from which he graduated with honors in Latin and mathematics in autumn 1901. After graduating in mathematics, physics and engineering from the Vienna University of Technology, he was appointed as Georg Hamel's assistant in Brünn (Brno). In 1905, still a student, he published an article on the geometry of curves called "Zur konstruktiven Infinitesimalgeometrie der ebenen Kurven," in the prestigious Zeitschrift für Mathematik und Physik.

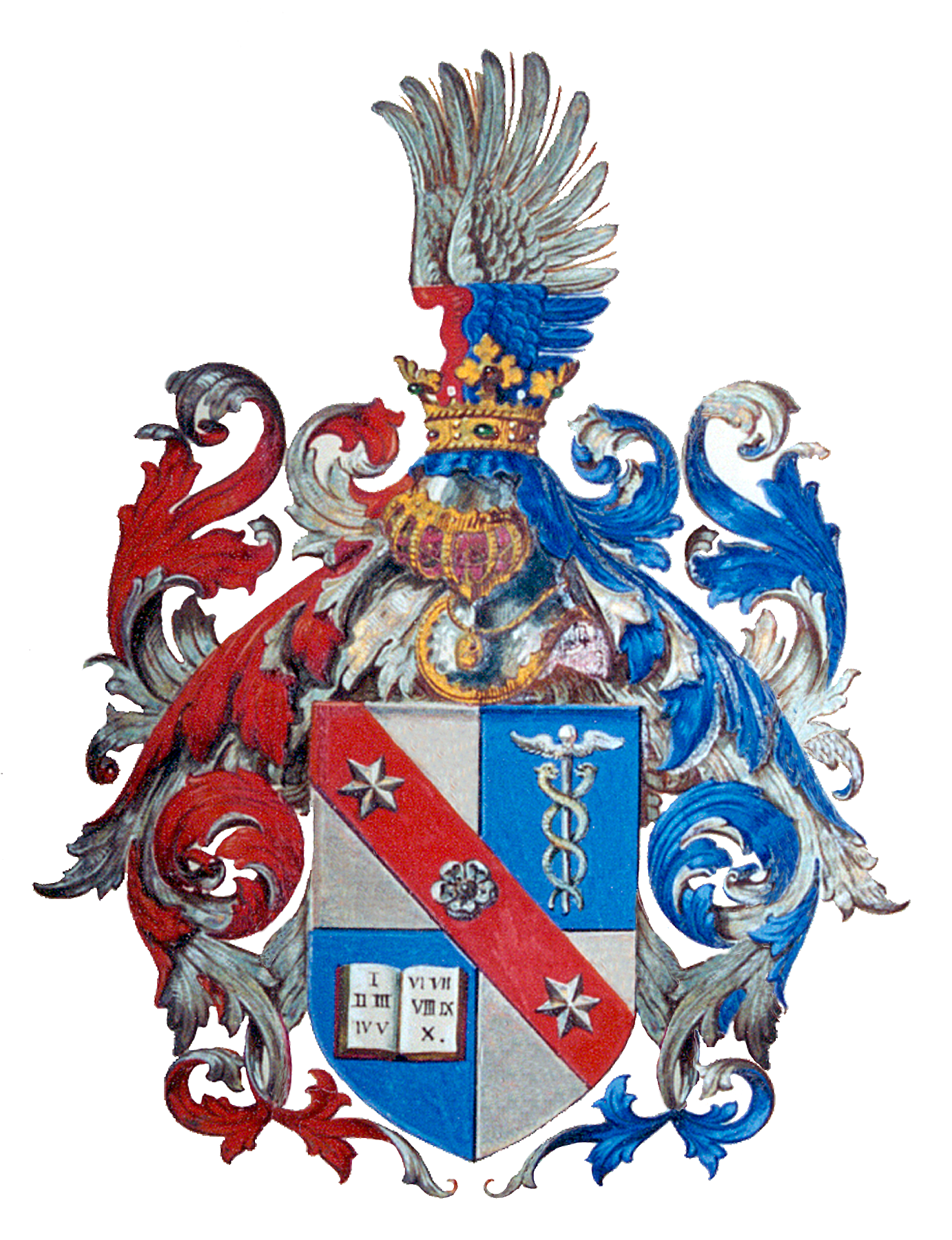
The von Mises's family crest

In 1908, von Mises was awarded a doctorate from Vienna (his dissertation was on "the determination of flywheel masses in crank drives") and he received his habilitation from Brünn (Brno) (on "Theory of the Waterwheels") to lecture on engineering. In 1909, at 26, he was appointed professor of applied mathematics in Strasbourg (then part of the German Empire) and received Prussian citizenship. His application for a teaching position at the Brno University of Technology was interrupted by the First World War.

Before the war he had already become a pilot and lectured on aircraft design, and in 1913 at Strasbourg he gave the first university course on powered flight. At the outbreak of war it was natural for him to join the Austro-Hungarian army as a test pilot and a flying instructor. In 1915, he supervised the construction of a 600-horsepower (450 kW) aircraft – the "Mises-Flugzeug" (Mises aircraft) for the Austrian army. It was completed in 1916 but never saw active service.

After the war, von Mises held the new chair of hydrodynamics and aerodynamics at the Dresden Technische Hochschule. In 1919 he was appointed director and full professor at the new Institute of Applied Mathematics created at the behest of Erhard Schmidt at the University of Berlin. In 1921 he founded the journal Zeitschrift für Angewandte Mathematik und Mechanik and became its editor.

With the rise of the National Socialist Party to power in 1933, Mises felt his position threatened, despite his First World War military service. He moved to Turkey, where he assumed the new chair of pure and applied mathematics at the University of Istanbul. In 1939 he accepted a position in the United States, where in 1944 he was appointed as Gordon McKay Professor of Aerodynamics and Applied Mathematics at Harvard University. In 1943 he married Hilda Geiringer, a mathematician who had been his assistant at the Institute and moved with her to Turkey and then to the U.S.

In 1950, von Mises declined honorary membership from the Communist-dominated East German Academy of Science.

== Contributions ==
In aerodynamics, von Mises made advances in boundary-layer flow theory and airfoil design. He developed the distortion energy theory of stress, an important factor in material strength calculations.

His ideas were not universally well received, although Alexander Ostrowski had said of him: "Only with the appointment of Richard von Mises to the University of Berlin did the first serious German school of applied mathematics with a broad sphere of influence come into existence. Von Mises was an incredibly dynamic person and at the same time amazingly versatile like Runge. He was especially well versed in the realm of technology." and also wrote "Because of his dynamic personality his occasional major blunders were somehow tolerated. One has even forgiven him his theory of probability." Yet Andrey Kolmogorov, whose rival axiomatisation was better received, was less severe: "The basis for the applicability of the results of the mathematical theory of probability to real 'random phenomena' must depend on some form of the frequency concept of probability, the unavoidable nature of which has been established by von Mises in a spirited manner."

In probability theory, he proposed the famous "birthday problem". He also defined the impossibility of a gambling system.

In solid mechanics, von Mises contributed to the theory of plasticity by formulating the von Mises yield criterion, independently of Tytus Maksymilian Huber.

He is often credited for the Principle of Maximum Plastic Dissipation.

The Gesellschaft für Angewandte Mathematik und Mechanik (Society of Applied Mathematics and Mechanics) awards a Richard von Mises Prize since 1989.

== Bibliography ==
=== Books ===
- Richard von Mises, Philipp Frank, Heinrich Weber, Bernhard Riemann, Die Differential- und Integralgleichungen der Mechanik und Physik, 1925, 1930.
- Richard von Mises, Wahrscheinlichkeitsrechnung und ihre Anwendungen in der Statistik und theoretischen Physik, 1931.
- Richard von Mises, The critical external pressure of cylindrical tubes under uniform radial and axial load, (Translation of Kritischer Außendruck zylindrischer Rohre, 1917), U.S. Experimental Model Basin, Navy Yard, 1933.
- Richard von Mises, P. Frank, H. Weber and B. Riemann, Die Differential- und Integralgleichungen der Mechanik und Physik, 2nd expanded. ed., 2 vols. New York, Mary S. Rosenberg: 1943.
- Richard von Mises, W. Prager and G. Kuerti, Theory of Flight, New York, McGraw-Hill, 1945.
- Richard Von Mises, Rilke in English,: A tentative bibliography, The Cosmos press, 1947
- Richard von Mises, Notes on mathematical theory of compressible fluid flow, Harvard University, Graduate School of Engineering, 1948.
- Richard von Mises, On Bergman's integration method in two-dimensional compressible fluid flow, Harvard University, Graduate School of Engineering, 1949.
- Richard von Mises, On the thickness of a steady shock wave, Harvard University, Dept. of Engineering, 1951
- Presented to Richard von Mises by Friends, Colleagues and Pupils, Studies in Mathematics and Mechanics, New York, 1954.
- Richard von Mises, Positivism: A Study in Human Understanding, G. Braziller, 1956. ISBN 0-486-21867-8 (Paperback, Dover, 1968 ISBN 0-486-21867-8).
- Richard von Mises, Hilda Geiringer & Geoffrey S. S. Ludford, Mathematical Theory of Compressible Fluid Flow Archived 4 November 2005 at the Wayback Machine. New York, Academic Press, 1958.
- Richard von Mises, Theory of Flight, New York, Dover, 1959. ISBN 0-486-60541-8
- Richard von Mises, Selected Papers of Richard von Mises, 2 volumes, AMS, Rhode Island, 1963, 1964.
- Richard von Mises, Mathematical Theory of Probability and Statistics, New York, Academic Press, 1964.
- Richard von Mises, Probability and Statistics, General, American Mathematical Society, 1964.
- Heinrich Sequenz ed. 150 Jahre Technische Hochschule in Wien. 1815–1965, Festschrift in 3 Volumes, Springer Verlag, Wien, New York, 1965.
- Richard von Mises and K. O. Friedrichs, Fluid Dynamics, New York: Springer-Verlag, 1971. ISBN 0-387-90028-4
- M. Pinl & L. Furtmüller, Mathematicians under Hitler, In Year Book XVIII of the Leo Baeck Institute, London, 1973.
- Richard von Mises, Theodore Von Karman, Advances in Applied Mechanics, Academic Press, 1975. ISBN 0-12-002015-7
- W. Roeder & H. A. Strauss, International Biographical Dictionary of Central European Émigrés 1933–1945, Saur, München, New York, London, Paris, 1980–1983.
- Richard von Mises, Probability, Statistics and Truth, 2nd rev. English ed., New York, Dover, 1981. ISBN 0-486-24214-5
- Richard von Mises, Kleines Lehrbuch des Positivismus. Einführung in die empiristische Wissenschaftsauffassung, Suhrkamp, 1990. ISBN 3-518-28471-1
- Richard von Mises, Wolfgang Gröbner, Wolfgang Pauli, Österreichische Mathematik und Physik, Die Zentralbibliothek, 1993. ISBN 3-900490-03-1
- Robert Winter, Das Akademische Gymnasium in Wien. Vergangenheit und Gegenwart, Wien, Köln, Weimar 1996.
- R. Siegmund-Schultze, Mathematiker auf der Flucht vor Hitler. Quellen und Studien zur Emigration einer Wissenschaft, Braunschweig und Wiesbaden, Vieweg, 1998.

=== Articles ===
- R. v. Mises, "Zur konstruktiven Infinitesimalgeometrie der ebenen Kurven," Zeitschrift für Mathematik und Physik, 52, 1905, pp. 44–85.
- R. v. Mises, "Zur Theorie der Regulatoren", Elektrotechnik und Maschinenbau 37, 1908, pp. 783–789.

== See also ==
- Birthday problem
- Impossibility of a gambling system
- Bernstein–von Mises theorem
- Cramér–von Mises criterion
- von Mises distribution
