= NCD =

NCD may refer to:

== Language ==
- Nemine contradicente (or N.C.D.), for 'with no one speaking against'
- Non-convergent discourse, an asymmetricly bilingual conversation

== Mathematics ==
- Normalized compression distance, in statistics and information theory
- Nearly completely decomposable Markov chain, in probability theory

== Medicine ==
- Non-communicable disease, that cannot be transmitted
- National coverage determination, American public healthcare guidance
- Neurocognitive disorder, a class of mental illness

== Organisations in government and politics ==
- National Council on Disability, United States
- National Center for Digitization, Serbia
- Naval Construction Division of the U.S. Navy Seabees
- New Centre-Right, Italy

== Other uses ==
- National Cleavage Day
- National Commission On Disabilities, an organization based in Liberia
- Naval Combat Dress, a uniform of the Canadian Forces
- Network Computing Devices, a company
- No claim discount on insurance policies
- Non-convertible_debenture, a debt instrument in corporate finance
