= Tao Jiang (computer scientist) =

Chinese-Canadian theoretical computer scientist and bioinformatician

- Born: 1963 (age 62–63)
- Education: USTC (BS); University of Minnesota (PhD)
- Honors: ISCB Fellow; ACM Fellow; AAAS Fellow
- Scientific career
- Fields: Computer Science
- Workplaces: McMaster University; Tsinghua University; University of California, Riverside
- Doctoral advisor: Oscar H. Ibarra

Tao Jiang (Chinese: 姜涛) is a Chinese-Canadian computer scientist and bioinformatician. He is Distinguished Professor of Computer Science and Engineering at the University of California, Riverside and was previously Distinguished Visiting Professor at Tsinghua University and Professor of Computer Science at McMaster University.

== Biography ==
Jiang received his BS degree in Computer Science from the University of Science and Technology of China, Hefei in 1984 and PhD in Computer Science in 1988 from the University of Minnesota, Twin Cities, advised by Oscar H. Ibarra. From 1989 to 2001, he was on faculty in the Department of Software at McMaster University, Hamilton, Ontario, Canada. He joined the University of California, Riverside as Professor of Computer Science and Engineering in 1999 and became Distinguished Professor of Computer Science and Engineering in 2019.

Jiang worked extensively in theoretical computer science, including automata theory, formal languages, computational complexity, applications of Kolmogorov complexity, and approximation algorithms, and computational biology, including multiple sequence alignment, computational phylogenetics and computational analysis of alternative splicing. In particular, his joint research with Ming Li and Paul Vitanyi on the well-known Heilbronn triangle problem using the incompressibility method was featured in New Scientist. His work on the inference and quantification of gene isoforms from RNA-Seq data was reported in Genetic Engineering and Biotechnology News. He was elected to the 2024 class of ISCB Fellows, "for pioneering research in computational biology and bioinformatics", the 2007 class of ACM Fellows, "for contributions to computational biology and computational complexity", and a Fellow of the American Association for the Advancement of Science (AAAS) in 2006.
