= Incompressibility =

Incompressibility may refer to:

- a property in thermodynamics and fluid dynamics, see Compressibility or Incompressible flow
- a property of a vector field, see Solenoidal vector field
- a topological property, see Incompressible surface
- a proof method in mathematics, see Incompressibility method
- a property of strings in computer science, see Incompressible string
