= Crossing sequence =

Crossing sequence may refer to:

- Crossing sequence (railways), a sequence of safety actions carried out when a train approaches and passes a level crossing
- Crossing sequence (Turing machines)
