= Incompressible =

Incompressible may refer to:

- Incompressible flow, in fluid mechanics
- incompressible vector field, in mathematics
- Incompressible surface, in mathematics
- Incompressible string, in computing
