= South-Eastern European Digitization Initiative =

The South-Eastern European Digitization Initiative (SEEDI) is an effort to develop awareness about digitization of cultural and scientific heritage in the South-Eastern European countries along the Lund Principles of the European Union. It will contribute to gathering and spreading specific and interdisciplinary knowledge from various institutions from the region and the European Union where leading experts in the field work.

== History ==
The SEEDI arose from the cooperation between researchers from Belgrade (Serbia) and Sofia (Bulgaria) which was formally expressed in the Borovets declaration (2003) where it was argued that:

...[the researchers and the heritage institutions from the region] face common problems and share common scientific and cultural heritage. The knowledge and experience of single institutions from our countries should not stay isolated. It is of great importance to take measures for increase of the communication and exchange of technological expertise, standards and practical skills within the region, taking into account the experience of colleagues outside the region.

— Borovets declaration

== Goals ==
Cultural and scientific heritage collections in the South-Eastern Europe still cannot be widely accessed in electronic form. The idea of the SEEDI is to overcome that by bringing together researches from regional and European centers having similar scientific and practical interest in digitization and to support cooperation between them. The aim is to create core groups of specialists, which would be able to consult, assist, monitor and develop innovative technologies and digitization projects collaborating with the local cultural and scientific heritage institutions.

The SEEDI would be implemented through several measures:

1. Conferences and workshops,
2. The journal Review of the National Center for Digitization,
3. The mailing list

To facilitate communication, dissemination and sharing each other's ideas, concerns, views and experiences in the field of digitization of cultural and scientific heritage.

The SEEDI is an open forum. The owners of ideas are invited to propose them through the SEEDI-communication tools and to find potential collaborators.

== Bibliography ==
- Zoran Ognjanovic, Milena Dobreva, Nikola Ikonomov, Tamara Butigan-Vucaj, South-Eastern European Digitization Initiative, in: Heritage and beyond, Council of Europe (2009), 179–182.
- South-Eastern European Network for Digitisation of Scientific and Cultural Heritage, Borovets declaration <http://elib.mi.sanu.ac.rs/files/journals/ncd/4/d015download.pdf> (05.05.2011)
- SEEDI <http://seedi.ncd.org.rs/> (05.05.2011)
