= Mutual intelligibility =

Closeness of linguistic varieties

Comparing Danish and Norwegian languages

- English
- I love eating Danish meat and drinking Norwegian water.
- Danish
- Jeg elsker at spise dansk kød og drikke norsk vand.
- Norwegian
- Jeg elsker å spise dansk kjøtt og drikke norsk vann.

Danish and Norwegian have a long history of interaction and share vocabulary, grammatical, and orthographic features.

In linguistics, mutual intelligibility is a relationship between different but related language varieties in which speakers of the different varieties can readily understand each other without prior familiarity or special effort. Mutual intelligibility is sometimes used to distinguish languages from dialects, although sociolinguistic factors are often also used.

Intelligibility between varieties can be asymmetric; that is, speakers of one variety may be able to better understand another than vice versa. An example of this is the case between Afrikaans and Dutch. It is generally easier for Dutch speakers to understand Afrikaans than for Afrikaans speakers to understand Dutch.

In a dialect continuum, neighbouring varieties are mutually intelligible, but differences mount with distance, so that more widely separated varieties may not be mutually intelligible. Intelligibility can be partial, as is the case with Azerbaijani and Turkish, or significant, as is the case with Bulgarian and Macedonian.

== Types ==
=== Asymmetric intelligibility ===
Asymmetric intelligibility refers to a relationship between two partially mutually intelligible languages in which one group of speakers has greater difficulty understanding the other language than vice versa, due to various linguistic or sociocultural factors. For example, if one language is related to another but has simplified its grammar, the speakers of the original language may understand the simplified language, but not vice versa. To illustrate, Dutch speakers tend to find it easier to understand Afrikaans as a result of Afrikaans's simplified grammar.

=== Among sign languages ===
Sign languages are not universal and usually not mutually intelligible, although there are also similarities among different sign languages. Sign languages are independent of spoken languages, have their own language families (see sign language families), and follow their own linguistic development over time. For example, British Sign Language (BSL) and American Sign Language (ASL) are mutually unintelligible, as BSL developed locally in Britain whereas ASL is from the Francosign family due to the early work of educator Thomas Hopkins Gallaudet and the American School for the Deaf.

The grammar of sign languages does not usually resemble that of the spoken languages used in the same geographical area. To illustrate, in terms of syntax, ASL shares more in common with spoken Japanese than with English.

== As a criterion for distinguishing languages ==
Some linguists use mutual intelligibility as the primary linguistic criterion for determining whether two speech varieties represent the same or different languages.

A primary challenge to this view is that speakers of closely related languages can often communicate effectively when they choose to. For example, in the case of transparently cognate languages recognized as distinct such as Spanish and Italian mutual intelligibility is neither binary nor absolute, but exists along a spectrum, influenced by numerous speaker-specific and contextual variables.

Classifications may also shift for reasons external to the languages themselves. As an example, in the case of a linear dialect continuum, the central varieties may become extinct, leaving only the varieties at both ends. Consequently, these end varieties may be reclassified as two languages, even though no significant linguistic change has occurred within the two extremes during the extinction of the central varieties.

Furthermore, political and social conventions often override considerations of mutual intelligibility. For example, the varieties of Chinese are often considered a single language, even though there is usually no mutual intelligibility between geographically separated varieties. This is similarly the case among the varieties of Arabic, which also share a single prestige variety in Modern Standard Arabic. In contrast, there is often significant intelligibility between different North Germanic languages. However, because there are various standard forms of the North Germanic languages, they are classified as separate languages.

It is often claimed by linguists that mutual intelligibility is completely gradual (successively decreasing more and more, especially in a dialect continuum) and thus not very useful as a criterion for demarcating boundaries between languages (unless they are separated by a clear language border), but a 2021 study suggests that it can allow for meaningful segmentation.

== Within dialect continua ==
A dialect continuum or dialect chain is a series of language varieties spoken across some geographical area such that neighboring varieties are mutually intelligible, but the differences accumulate over distance so that widely separated varieties may not be. This is a typical occurrence with widely spread languages and language families around the world, when these languages did not spread recently. Some prominent examples include the Indo-Aryan languages across large parts of India, varieties of Arabic across north Africa and southwest Asia, the Turkic languages, the varieties of Chinese, and parts of the Romance, Germanic and Slavic families in Europe. Terms used in older literature include dialect area (Leonard Bloomfield) and L-complex (Charles F. Hockett).

=== North Germanic ===
Northern Germanic languages spoken in Scandinavia form a dialect continuum where the two furthermost dialects have almost no mutual intelligibility. As such, spoken Danish and Swedish normally have low mutual intelligibility, but Swedes in the Öresund region (including Malmö and Helsingborg), across the strait from the Danish capital Copenhagen, understand Danish somewhat better, largely due to the proximity of the region to Danish-speaking areas. While Norway was under Danish rule, the Bokmål written standard of Norwegian developed from Dano-Norwegian, a koiné language that evolved among the urban elite in Norwegian cities during the later years of the union. Additionally, Norwegian assimilated a considerable amount of Danish vocabulary as well as traditional Danish expressions. As a consequence, spoken mutual intelligibility is not reciprocal.

=== Romance ===
Because of the difficulty of imposing boundaries on a continuum, various counts of the Romance languages are given. For example, in The Linguasphere register of the world's languages and speech communities, David Dalby lists 23 languages based on mutual intelligibility:

- Iberian Romance: Portuguese, Galician, Mirandese, Astur-Leonese, Castilian (Spanish), Aragonese;
- Occitano-Romance: Catalan, Occitan;
- Southern Romance: Sardinian;
- Gallo-Romance: Langues d'oïl (including French), Piedmontese, Franco-Provençal;
- Rhaeto-Romance: Romansh, Ladin, Friulian;
- Gallo-Italic: Piedmontese, Ligurian, Lombard, Emilian-Romagnol, Venetian;
- Italo-Dalmatian (including Italian): Corsican, Neapolitan, Sicilian, Istriot, Dalmatian (extinct);
- Eastern Romance: Daco-Romanian, Istro-Romanian, Aromanian, Megleno-Romanian, Romanian, Moldovan.

=== South Slavic ===
The non-standard vernacular dialects of Serbo-Croatian (Kajkavian, Chakavian and Torlakian) diverge more significantly from all four normative varieties of Serbo-Croatian. Their mutual intelligibility varies greatly between the dialects themselves, with the standard Shtokavian dialect, and with other languages. For example, Torlakian, which is considered a subdialect of Serbian Old Shtokavian, has significant mutual intelligibility with Macedonian and Bulgarian.

== List of mutually intelligible languages ==
=== Afroasiatic ===
- Tunisian Arabic and Libyan Arabic (68–70% of sentences)
- Tunisian Arabic and Maltese (32–33% of sentences; Maltese is written with the Latin script, while Tunisian Arabic is written with the Arabic script)

=== Atlantic–Congo ===
- Kinyarwanda and Kirundi
- Luganda and Lusoga (partially)
- Nkore and Kiga
- Zulu, Northern Ndebele (significantly), Xhosa (significantly), Swazi (significantly), Southern Ndebele (partially)

=== Austronesian ===
- Banjarese, Berau Malay, and Brunei Malay
- Iban and Malay, especially with Sarawakian Malay (partially)
- Tokelauan, Samoan, and Tuvaluan
- Maranao and Iranun

=== Indo-European ===
==== Germanic ====
- Danish, Norwegian, and Swedish (significantly and asymmetrically)
- Dutch and Afrikaans (significantly and asymmetrically)
- Dutch and Frisian (partially)
- Dutch and German (partially)
- English and Scots (significantly)
- German and Hutterite German (significantly)
- German and Frisian (partially)
- German and Luxembourgish (partially)
- German and Yiddish (partially)
- German and Plautdietsch/Mennonite Low German (partially)
- German and Low German (partially)
- German and Pennsylvania Dutch (partially)

==== Romance ====
Speakers of Romance language may be able to understand each other, regardless of the branches of their languages (for example Spanish and Portuguese), however the degree of mutual intelligibility often varies (for example speakers of Spanish and Romanian are not likely to be able to communicate more than extremely simple ideas to each other).

- Portuguese and Galician (significantly)
- Romanian, Aromanian, Megleno-Romanian and Istro-Romanian (significantly)
- Spanish and Italian (partially)
- Spanish and Judaeo-Spanish (spoken or written in the Latin alphabet; Judaeo-Spanish may also be written in the Hebrew alphabet). Depending on dialect and the number of non-Spanish loanwords used.
- Spanish and Portuguese (significantly and asymmetrically)

==== Slavic Languages ====
Due to common origins speakers of Slavic languages tend to be able to understand each other, often beyond the different branches of Slavic languages. However, the degree of mutual intelligibility often varies and can sometimes be very low. To illustrate, a speaker of Ukrainian could easily communicate with a speaker of Bulgarian and vice versa, while they could also hold a conversation with a speaker of Polish and vice versa. However, communication between Polish speakers and Bulgarian speakers is often very difficult, if not almost impossible.

===== East Slavic =====
- Belarusian and Ukrainian (significantly)
- Rusyn and Ukrainian (significantly to moderately)
- Belarusian, Ukrainian and Russian (moderately and asymmetrically)

===== South Slavic =====
- Macedonian and Bulgarian (significantly)
- Macedonian, Bulgarian and Serbo-Croatian (moderately to significantly)
- Slovene and Serbo-Croatian (partially)

===== West Slavic =====
- Czech and Slovak (significantly)
- Polish and Czech (partially and asymmetrically)
- Polish and Slovak (reasonably to partially)

==== Other subdivisions ====
- Irish and Scottish Gaelic (partially)
- Marathi and certain dialects of Konkani (significantly)

=== Kra-Dai ===
- Central Thai, Lao/Isan, Northern Thai, Shan and Tai Lue

=== Sino-Tibetan ===
- Akha, Honi and Hani (variety of different written scripts)
- Dungan and Mandarin, especially with Central Plains Mandarin

=== Turkic ===
- Azerbaijani, Gagauz and Turkish (significantly)
- Uzbek and Uyghur

=== Uralic ===
- Finnish and Estonian (partially)
- Finnish and Karelian (significantly)

=== Tungusic ===
- Manchu and Xibe

=== Others ===
- Manglish and Singlish

== List of dialects or varieties sometimes considered separate languages ==
- Catalan: Valencian – the standard forms are structurally the same language and share the vast majority of their vocabulary, and hence highly mutually intelligible. They are not considered separate languages and both names -Valencian and Catalan- are officially recognized.
- Hindustani: Hindi and Urdu.
- Malay: Indonesian (the standard regulated by Indonesia), Brunei and Malaysian (the standard used in Malaysia and Singapore). Both varieties are based on the same material basis and hence are generally mutually intelligible, despite the numerous lexical differences. Certain linguistic sources also treat the two standards on equal standing as varieties of the same Malay language. However, vernacular or less formal varieties spoken between these two countries share limited intelligibility, evidenced by Malaysians having difficulties understanding Indonesian sinetron (soap opera) aired on their TV stations (which actually uses a colloquial offshoot heavily influenced by Betawi vernacular of Jakarta rather than the formal standard acquired in academic contexts) and vice versa.
- Northeastern Neo-Aramaic (NENA): NENA is a dialect continuum, with some dialects being mutually intelligible and others not. While Zakho Jewish Neo-Aramaic and Zakho Christian Neo-Aramaic are mutually intelligible, especially on the eastern edge of the continuum (in Iran), Jewish and Christian NENA varieties spoken in the same town are not mutually intelligible.
- Persian: Iranian Persian (natively simply known as Persian), Dari and Tajik – Persian and Dari are written in Perso-Arabic script, while Tajik is written in Cyrillic script.
- Serbo-Croatian: Bosnian, Croatian, Montenegrin, and Serbian – the national varieties are structurally the same language, all constituting normative varieties of the Shtokavian dialect, and hence mutually intelligible, spoken and written (if the Latin alphabet is used). For political reasons, they are sometimes considered distinct languages.
- Chittagonian: Rohingya – Chittagonian and Rohingya are two closely related Indo-Aryan languages with similar structures but distinct differences, mainly in their vocabulary due to different historical and cultural influences. Chittagonian borrows words from Sanskrit, while Rohingya incorporates loanwords from Burmese, Arabic and Persian.

== See also ==
- Dialect levelling
- Lexical similarity
- Lingua franca
- Multilingualism
- Non-convergent discourse
- Sister language
