= Disability in Liberia =

People with disability in Liberia face many challenges. The cultural attitude towards disability in Liberia is largely negative. Often, it is seen as the result of witchcraft or as punishment for a person's behavior. However, the government and non-governmental organizations are working towards a more inclusive country for people with disabilities.

== Demographics ==
Statistics from 2008 show that around 14 percent of the population of Liberia has a disability.

== Policy ==
The government of Liberia has stated that it has a commitment to providing an inclusive society for people with disabilities. In 2005, Liberia created the National Commission On Disabilities Liberia. Liberia signed and ratified the Convention on the Rights of Persons with Disabilities in 2012.

Liberia has various protections for people with disabilities in the workforce. The government also promotes tax incentives for hiring people with disabilities and has a target of 4% employment for people with disabilities.

People with disabilities have received less attention than other groups of people who are at risk in the country.

=== Education ===
The Ministry of Education of Liberia has the Department of Science, Technical, Vocational, and Special Education, which oversees education for students with disabilities. In the FY 2023 National Budget for the Republic of Liberia, this department received 0.28% of the Ministry of Education Budget. Also, the fiscal year 2023 budget did not list a specific allocation to special education that would service students with disabilities in Liberia. In the FY 2023 National Budget, one subsidy is explicitly provided for a school of students with disabilities, the Liberia School for the Blind. In turn, most funding of schools for students with disabilities is based on non-governmental organizations and religious organizations.

=== Non-governmental organizations ===
Non-governmental organizations in the country have called on the government to secure the rights of people with disabilities. Many of these groups have adopted a National Action Plan for the Inclusion of Persons with Disabilities. Non-governmental organizations advocating for people with disabilities became more involved in the process of advocacy following the 2005 elections in Liberia.

Humanity & Inclusion has been working in Liberia since 2000. The National Union of the Disabled was established in 2009 to advocate for people with disabilities in Liberia. Other prominent non-governmental organizations in Liberia include the Disabled Females International-Liberia, Organisation for the Social Integration of the Liberian Deaf, Liberia National Association of the Blind (LNAB) and the Christian Association of the Blind-Liberia.

== Schools for Students with Disabilities ==
Please note that this is not a comprehensive list of schools that serve students with disabilities in Liberia; many schools lack a digital presence due to funding limitations.

Schools for Students with Intellectual Disabilities

My Heart's Appeal Center, a pilot school for students with Intellectual Disabilities, opened in Gaye Town, Monrovia, in 2024. The pilot program is focused on vocational and academic training for teenagers and adults with intellectual disabilities. The NGO My Heart's Appeal Inc. was founded in 2011. It started this school after working with over 150 Liberians with intellectual disabilities through respite care programs and preliminary projects, and it founded the Down Syndrome Association of Liberia.

His Safe Haven is located in Gbarnga, Bong County. It was started by missionaries to meet the spiritual, physical, and educational needs of children with disabilities, including their families and communities. The religious organization operates His Safe Haven Village, a foster care center for children with disabilities. At the same time, it works with families and communities to provide support and resources to care for children with disabilities within the family instead of placing the child at His Safe Haven Village.

Schools for Students with Visual Impairment and Blindness

The Liberia School for the Blind was founded in 1977 in Virginia, Monrovia. In 2023, it was serving 45 residential students. The Liberia School for the Blind was the only school for students with disabilities to receive governmental support through a US$50,000 subsidy within the FY 2023 National Budget. To provide additional support, the NGO Youth for Global Initiative works with the school, focusing on sourcing assistive technology for visual impairments and delivering trainings for the school on using the technology.

Schools for Students with Hearing Impairments and Deafness

Oscar & Viola Stewart Deaf School was founded in 1996 in Monrovia and is funded through religious organizations. The school provides educational and residential services for students with hearing impairments and deafness, ages 2–18. In 2017, Oscar Viola Stewart Deaf School served 50-75 students in pre-primary school to 9th grade.

Oscar Romero School for the Deaf, founded in 2008, is in Tubmanburg, Bomi County. Mary's Meals and religious organizations fund it. In 2024, Oscar Romero School for the Deaf served over 150 students. The school is pre-primary and elementary, for ages 3 to 6th grade. The school provides supports and services for students with hearing impairments and deafness to attend community-based junior and senior high schools. In 2024, Oscar Romero School for the Deaf served over 150 students. ref name=OVS/>

United Methodist Church Hope for the Deaf School is located in Sinkor, Monrovia, and is funded through religious organizations. In 2017, the school served 60 students with hearing impairments and deafness.

== Accessibility ==
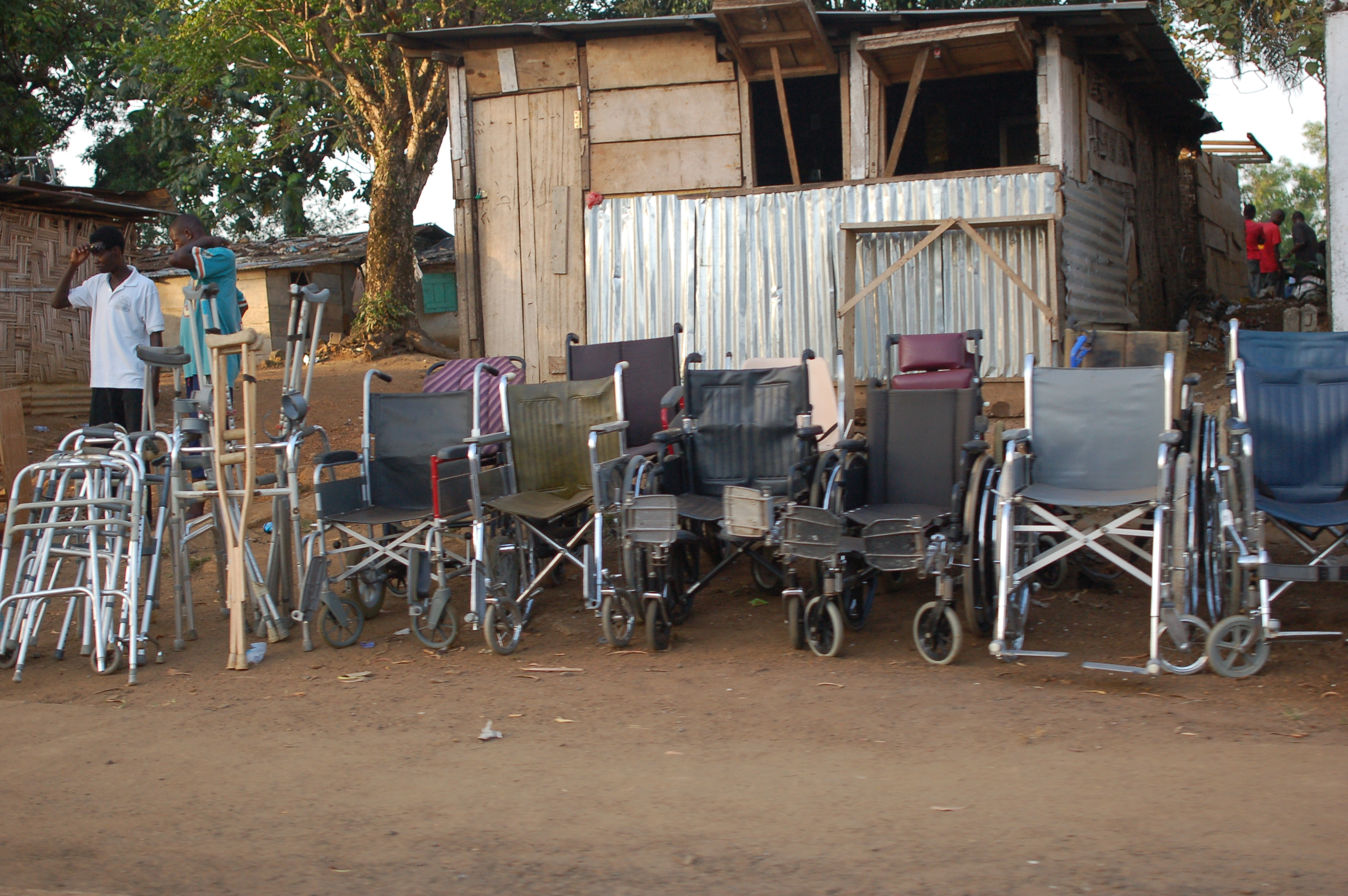
Wheelchair merchant in Monrovia, 2009.

There is a lack of physical accessibility in Liberia. Many government buildings do not have ramps and there are not enough sidewalks in cities.

== Cultural attitudes ==
People with disabilities in Liberia often face discrimination and marginalization. There is a tradition of believing that a family has been subject to witchcraft when a child with disabilities is born and the family may be shunned and the child subject to cruel treatment.

Disabilities that were caused by war are also stigmatized. These can be mental disabilities, such as posttraumatic stress disorder (PTSD) or physical disabilities, such as amputations.

== Causes ==
The Second Liberian Civil War caused various types of disability to as many as 800,000 people. Many people in Liberia have congenital conditions, but others become disabled due to birth trauma.

== Sport ==
Many of the members of the Liberian amputee football team were once former child soldiers. Liberia participated in the first All African Amputee Football Tournament in 2007 which was sponsored by FIFA and held in Sierra Leone. After the tournament, Liberia along with Ghana and Sierra Leone formed the African Nations Amputee Football Federation (AFFA).

== See also ==
- National Commission On Disabilities
