= Paul Vitányi =

Dutch theoretical computer scientist

Paul Michael Béla Vitányi
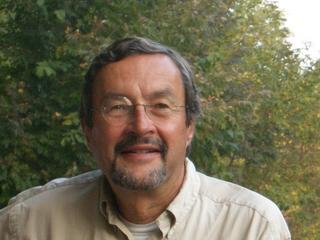
- Paul M. B. Vitányi 2005
- Born: 21 July 1944 (age 82); Budapest
- Education: Delft University of Technology; Free University of Amsterdam
- Known for: Simplicity theory Kolmogorov complexity Normalized Compression Distance; Normalized Google Distance; Information Distance; Incompressibility Method; Shared register Kolmogorov structure function Reversible computing
- Scientific career
- Fields: Computer science, Mathematics
- Workplaces: CWI, University of Amsterdam, University of Copenhagen, Massachusetts Institute of Technology, Monash University, Tokyo Institute of Technology, NICTA at University of New South Wales, Boston University, University of Waterloo
- Doctoral advisor: Jaco de Bakker; Arto Salomaa
- Doctoral students: Ronald Cramer; John Tromp; Barbara Terhal; Ronald de Wolf; Rudi Cilibrasi

Paul Michael Béla Vitányi (born 21 July 1944) is a Dutch computer scientist, professor of computer science at the University of Amsterdam and researcher at the Dutch Centrum Wiskunde & Informatica.

== Biography ==
Vitányi was born in Budapest to a Dutch mother and a Hungarian father. He received his degree of mathematical engineer from Delft University of Technology in 1971 and his Ph.D. from the Free University of Amsterdam in 1978.

== Career ==
Vitányi was appointed professor of computer science at the University of Amsterdam, and researcher at the National Research Institute for Mathematics and Computer Science in the Netherlands (CWI, initially Mathematical Centre [MC]) where he is currently a CWI Fellow. He was guest professor at the University of Copenhagen in 1978; research associate at the Massachusetts Institute of Technology in 1985/1986; Gaikoku-Jin Kenkyuin (councilor professor) at INCOCSAT at the Tokyo Institute of Technology in 1998; visiting professor at Boston University in 2004, at Monash University in 1996 and at the National ICT of Australia NICTA at University of New South Wales in 2004/2005; visiting professor at and adjunct professor of computer science at the University of Waterloo from 2005.

Vitányi has served on the editorial boards of Distributed Computing (1987–2003), Information Processing Letters; the Theory of Computing Systems; the Parallel Processing Letters; the International journal of Foundations of Computer Science; the Entropy; the Information; the SN Computer Science; the Journal of Computer and Systems Sciences (guest editor), and elsewhere.

== Awards and honours ==
- 1999 – National Outstanding Scientific and Technological Book Award of the People's Republic of China
- 2003 – CWI Fellow
- 2003 – Bronze Medal University of Helsinki
- 2005 – Adjunct Professor Computer Science University of Waterloo
- 2007 – Knighthood in the Order of the Netherlands Lion,
- 2007 – International Federation for Information Processing (IFIP) Silver Core Award
- 2011 – Member of the Academia Europaea.
- 2020 - McGuffey Longevity Award of the Textbook & Academic Authors Association (TAA).

== Work ==
Vitányi has worked on cellular automata, computational complexity, distributed and parallel computing, machine learning and prediction, physics of computation, Kolmogorov complexity, information theory and quantum computing, publishing over 200 research papers and some books. As of 2020 his work on normalized compression distance was used in 15 US patents and on normalized Google distance in 10 US patents.

Together with Ming Li he pioneered theory and applications of Kolmogorov complexity. They co-authored the textbook An Introduction to Kolmogorov Complexity and Its Applications, parts of which have been translated into Chinese, Russian and Japanese. The textbook received the William Holmes McGuffey Longevity Award of the Textbook & Academic Authors Association (TAA) (2020), and the Chinese translation received the National Outstanding Scientific and Technological Book Award of the People's Republic of China (1999).
