= Thomas N. Hibbard =

American Mathematician and Computer Scientist

Thomas Nathaniel Hibbard (March 14, 1929 – February 11, 2016) was an American mathematician and computer scientist.

Thomas N. Hibbard received the B.S. degree in physics from Pacific University, Forest Grove, OR, in 1951, the M.S. degree in mathematics from the University of Illinois, Urbana, in 1954, and the Ph.D. degree in mathematics from the University of California, Los Angeles, in 1966.

From 1955 to 1958 T. N. Hibbard was a Scientific Programmer at the RAND Corporation, Santa Monica, CA, programming the JOHNNIAC, an early computer built by Rand, and from 1959 to 1965 a member of the research staff of the System Development Corporation, Santa Monica, CA, where he worked with Seymour Ginsburg and Joseph Ullian in automata theory and formal languages. Following a three-year visiting faculty appointment at the Catholic University of Salta, Argentina, he joined the University of Southern California, Los Angeles, as an assistant professor of Computer Science in 1970. He conducted research in searching, sorting, and data structures, helping to pioneer the field of analysis of algorithms.^{[H62]}^{[H63]} In 1974, he started research with his then faculty colleague Armin B. Cremers, initiating the theory and applications of data spaces.^{[CH]} In February 1976, he joined the staff of the Jet Propulsion Laboratory, Pasadena, CA, working on the Voyager, IRAS and Galileo project until his retirement from JPL in 1986. At that time, he joined the Information Sciences Institute (ISI), Marina del Rey, CA, and did experimental research on parallel computing until 1989, when he returned to Salta, Argentina, to teach at the National University (UNSA).

== Contributions to Computer Science ==
Hibbard was a co-inventor of the binary search tree. He was the first to propose the so-called Hibbard deletion for binary search trees, in which the node to be deleted is replaced by its successor. Hibbard proposed one of several widely cited increment sequences for the Shellsort algorithm.

== Selected publications ==
H62.	Hibbard, Thomas N. (1962). "Some combinatorial properties of certain trees with applications to searching and sorting". Journal of the ACM. 9 (1): 13–28. doi:10.1145/321105.321108. S2CID 16678090.

H63.	Hibbard, Thomas N. (1963). "An Empirical Study of Minimal Storage Sorting". Communications of the ACM. 6 (5): 206–213. doi:10.1145/366552.366557. S2CID 12146844.

CH.	Cremers, Armin B.; Hibbard, Thomas N. (September 1978). "Formal Modeling of Virtual Machines". IEEE Transactions on Software Engineering. SE-4 (5): 426–436. doi:10.1109/TSE.1978.233862. S2CID 17894202.
