= National Commission On Disabilities =

Liberian autonomous agency

Agency overview
- Formed: December 29, 2005
- Jurisdiction: Government Of Liberia
- Employees: Thirty Four (34)
- Annual budget: $576,384
- Agency executives: J. Aaron Wright Sr., Acting Chairperson; Emary Amos Jessie, Acting Deputy Director - Administration; Charles G. Saypahn, Deputy Director - Technical; Tim-Moore Weah, Comptroller; Hannah J. Watson, Human Resource Personnel
- Website: www.ncd.gov.lr

The National Commission on Disabilities (NCD) is the Autonomous Agency established in Liberia by an Act of Legislation on November 23, 2005, and printed into Handbill by the Ministry of Foreign Affairs December 29, 2005.

== History ==
The National Commission on Disabilities was established by an Act of the Liberian Legislature in 2005 to address systemic challenges faced by persons with disabilities and provide a centralized institutional mechanism for disability advocacy, coordination, and monitoring.

== Mandate and functions ==
The Commission's core functions include:

- Advocating for the rights of persons with disabilities
- Advising the Government of Liberia on disability policy
- Coordinating disability inclusion efforts across ministries and agencies
- Supporting implementation of national disability frameworks

Thes functions align with Liberia's commitments under national legislation and international instruments supporting disability rights.

== Background ==
As part of the commission's mandate in consistent with the Act establishing the National Commission on Disabilities (NCD) by the 51st National Legislature of the Republic of Liberia in November 2005, NCD was established to have jurisdiction over matters involving and appertaining to the welfare and wellbeing of PWDs including but not limited to carrying out empowerment through Capacity Building, Small Business, Livelihood Skills, Medical, Educational Support through School aids, result driven Programs and Projects, Advocacy, Monitoring and Supervising the effective delivery of social services within the territorial confines of Liberia. The NCD currently works with Seventy-Eight (78) Organizations of Persons with Disabilities (OPWDs) and subsidize them through Budgetary Support

== International support and engagement ==
UNDP and National Action Plan

UNDP on August 9, 2021, commended the outgoing Chairperson/ED of the National Commission on Disabilities (NCD), Madam Ricardia Badio Dennis, for successfully steering the development of the country's National Action Plan for inclusion of persons with disabilities (PWDs) in Liberia (2018 – 2022). Though in times prior to their commendation, the UNDP previously outlined issues faced by PWDs in Liberia. In a press release done before the Commission conclusion on the country's first-ever National Action Plan on Disability Inclusion 2018–2022, UNDP stated that country still has a long way to go in ensuring that people with disabilities are guaranteed of, and can fully enjoy their human rights, an assessment of the current National Action Plan has revealed. Welcoming their in-coming Chairperson/ED Madam Daintowon Domah Pay-Bayee, UNDP's representative, Mr. Boye Johnson, reaffirmed the organization's commitment to continue supporting the commission's work, and urged her to take the National Action Plan forward by involving more PWDs in every aspect of its implementation.

United Nations system support

The United Nations through its then resident coordinator, Mr. Niels Scott, reemphasized the UN continual support to the National Commission on Disabilities at the program marking the International Day of Persons With Disabilities. During the same time President George Weah also pledge his unwavering support to the Community of Persons With Disabilities.

== National policy framework and initiatives ==
National Action Plan implementation

On December 7, 2021, The NCD leadership presented a national roadmap or a framework to the government to work with. It prioritizes work and employment, empowerment, education, healthcare, sports and recreation, and others, in its nine thematic voluminous document presented to government. At that summit the President of Liberia, H.E. Dr. George Manneh Weah, reiterated his government's full support to PWDs. Living up to his words, later in July 2022, donations were made to the disabled community by the Liberian leader President George Weah. The donation was done through the National Commission of Disabilities (NCD) at the weekend, as the head of the Commission along with the code of officials toured across Montserrado County. The Liberian leader's gesture included L$50,000 and 25 bags of rice for each home and L$5,000.00 and a bag of rice to each individual member languishing on various street corners in Monrovia and its environs.

== Government assistance and empowerment programs ==
Economic empowerment projects

The National Commission on Disabilities (NCD) also began a US$250,000 initial empowerment project for people with disabilities in July 2022. The empowerment project was a government initiative that was aimed at improving and sustaining the livelihood of persons living with disabilities across Montserrado County.

Its main focus was intended to ensure that persons living with disabilities who are often seen on the streets in search of daily bread are economically empowered and are able to take care of their daily needs without going out on the streets to be given handouts.

All through the existence of the National Commission On Disabilities, one of its main focus has been the inclusion of persons living with disabilities in the country's governance process. Thus making it clear that People With Disabilities are also very capable to make impact in the society if they are given the chance/opportunity to acquire the necessary skills, and the place to exercise those skills acquired Therefore, through the final process of the National Action Plan by the National Commission On Disabilities, everything affecting the lives of persons with disabilities were addressed and the way forward was established through a county to county engagement and a final two days Symposium in Monrovia. In November 2022 PWDs from all the 15 Counties of Liberia gathered at Ganta City in Nimba County to celebrate the International Day of Persons With Disabilities, as well as to present the Final copy of the National Action Plan to the government of Liberia.

== Leadership and administration ==
Daintowon Domah Pay-Bayee was appointed Chairperson and Executive Director of the Commission following the tenure of Ricardia Badio Dennis. During her term. she oversaw the implementation phase of Liberia's National Action Plan of Disability Inclusion (2018-2022), coordinating county-level consultations and stakeholder engagement to finalize the plan. Her appointment was supported by the United Nations Development Programme (UNDP), which reaffirmed its commitment to working with the Commission under her leadership.

On May 28, 2024, President Joseph Boakai nominated Samuel S. Dean Sr, a former representative aspirant, as the new Chairperson of the National on Commission. Assuming his role as Chairperson, Hon. Dean stressed the need to increase the budget of the Commission, which was drastically reduced from $629,000.00 to $280,000.00, be increased to at least $1.5 Million to enable the commission to implement several crucial initiatives aimed at improving the lives of persons with disabilities in Liberia.

Administrative actions and audit

In December 2025, President Boakai suspended the Executive Director, Mr. Samuel Dean, and Deputy Director, Madam Winifred Paye, pending the outcome of a comprehensive audit ordered at the recommendation of a special investigative committee. To maintain continuity, he appointed Apostle J. Aaron Wright, Sr. as Acting Executive Director and Emary Amos Jessie as Acting Deputy Executive Director and directed the General Auditing Commission (GAC) to conduct a full audit.

== Staff ==
- Acting Chairperson - J. Aaron Wright Sr.
- Deputy Director - Administration: Emary Amos Jessie
- Deputy Director - Technical: Charles G. Saypahn
- Comptroller - Tim-Moore Weah
- Human Resource Personnel - Hannah J. Watson

== See also ==
- Disability in Liberia
