= Donald Shell =

American computer scientist (1924–2015)

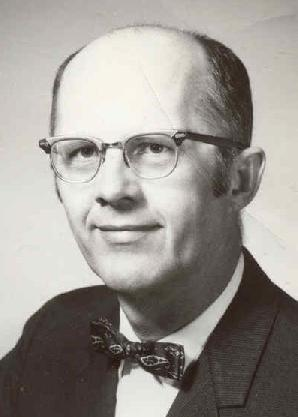
- Born: March 1, 1924
- Died: November 2, 2015 (aged 91); Asheville, North Carolina
- Education: Michigan Tech; University of Cincinnati
- Known for: Shell sort
- Scientific career
- Fields: Mathematics; Computer science

Donald L. Shell (March 1, 1924 – November 2, 2015) was an American computer scientist who designed the Shellsort sorting algorithm. He acquired his Ph.D. in mathematics from the University of Cincinnati in 1959, and published the Shellsort algorithm in the Communications of the ACM in July that same year.

== Career ==
Donald Shell acquired a B.S. in Civil Engineering from the Michigan College of Mining and Technology which is now Michigan Technological University. This was a four-year degree which he acquired in three years with the highest GPA given in the college's history. A record which persisted for more than 30 years. After acquiring his degree he went into the Army Corps of Engineers, and from there to the Philippines to help repair damages during World War II. When he returned after the war, he married Alice McCullough and returned to Michigan Technological University, where he taught mathematics. In 1949 they moved to Cincinnati, Ohio, for Don to work for General Electric's engines division, where he developed a convergence algorithm and wrote a program to perform performance cycle calculations for GE's first aircraft jet engines. He also attended the University of Cincinnati, where in 1951 he acquired a M.S. in mathematics and, in 1959, acquired his Ph.D. in Mathematics. In July of that year he published the Shellsort algorithm and "The Share 709 System: A Cooperative Effort". In 1958, he and A. Spitzbart had published "A Chebycheff Fitting Criterion".

Although he is most widely known for his Shellsort algorithm, his Ph.D. is also considered by some to be the first major investigation of the convergence of infinite exponentials, with some very deep results of the convergence into the complex plane. This area has grown considerably and research related to it is now investigated in what is more commonly called tetration. In October 1962 he wrote "On the Convergence of Infinite Exponentials" in the Proceedings of the American Mathematical Society.

After acquiring his Ph.D., Shell moved to Schenectady, New York, to become Manager of Engineering for General Electric's new Information Services Department, the first commercial enterprise to link computers together using the client–server architecture. This architecture is the fundamental design for the Internet. He worked with John George Kemeny and Thomas Eugene Kurtz to commercialize the Dartmouth Time-Sharing System in 1963.

In 1971 Shell wrote "Optimizing the Polyphase Sort" in the Communications of the ACM, and in 1972 he joined with a colleague, Ralph Mosher (who designed the walking truck), to start a business, Robotics Inc., where he was the General Manager and chief software engineer. Four years later, in 1976, they sold the company and Shell returned to General Electric Information Services Corporation.

In 1984, he retired and moved to North Carolina.

He died at age 91 on 2 November 2015 in Asheville, North Carolina. He was survived by his wife Helen, his two sons, five of his six step sons and daughters and all of their spouses.

== Personal life ==
Shell married Alice McCullough after returning from World War II. They had two sons. Alice became ill with cancer, and Shell cared for her for the last six years of her life. After Alice's death, Shell married Virginia Law, whose husband had died in Africa. After 30 years of marriage she died of congestive heart failure due to malaria contracted in Africa. Shell cared for her for the last years of her life.

At age 81, Shell married Helen Whiting.
