= Batcher odd–even mergesort =

Construction of sorting networks

- Visualization of the odd–even mergesort network with eight inputs
- Class: Sorting algorithm
- Data structure: Array
- Worst-case performance: $O(\log^2(n))$ parallel time
- Best-case performance: $O(\log^2(n))$ parallel time
- Average performance: $O(\log^2(n))$ parallel time
- Worst-case space complexity: $O(n\log^2(n))$ non-parallel time
- Optimal: No

Batcher's odd–even mergesort is a generic construction devised by Ken Batcher for sorting networks of size O(n (log n)^{2}) and depth O((log n)^{2}), where n is the number of items to be sorted. Although it is not asymptotically optimal, Knuth concluded in 1998, with respect to the AKS network that "Batcher's method is much better, unless n exceeds the total memory capacity of all computers on earth!"

It is popularized by the second GPU Gems book, as an easy way of doing reasonably efficient sorts on graphics-processing hardware.

== Pseudocode ==
Various recursive and iterative schemes are possible to calculate the indices of the elements to be compared and sorted. This is one iterative technique to generate the indices for sorting n elements:

# note: the input sequence is indexed from 0 to (n-1)
for p = 1, 2, 4, 8, ... # as long as p < n
  for k = p, p/2, p/4, p/8, ... # as long as k >= 1
    for j = mod(k,p) to (n-1-k) with a step size of 2k
      for i = 0 to min(k-1, n-j-k-1) with a step size of 1
        if floor((i+j) / (p*2)) == floor((i+j+k) / (p*2))
          compare and sort elements (i+j) and (i+j+k)

== See also ==
- Bitonic sorter
- Pairwise sorting network
