= Non-convergent discourse =

A non-convergent discourse (NCD) is a discourse in which the participants do not converge in their language, which results in the use of different languages. Alternative names for this phenomenon are asymmetric and bilingual discourse.

The term was introduced by the sociologist Reitze Jonkman. He distinguishes two motivations for people to engage in an NCD:

- Insufficient active knowledge of the other participants' language, combined with a good passive knowledge. It usually takes longer for a person learning a foreign language to speak it fluently than to understand it when it is being spoken. This type of NCD is common in areas of the world where closely related languages or dialects are spoken, but which are not individually widespread to be commonly taught to outsiders. Such examples include the North Germanic languages of Scandinavia; Dutch and Afrikaans; Romance languages such as Italian, Spanish, Portuguese, and local regional languages from Portugal, Spain and Italy; various Slavic languages within each Slavic branch; Indo-Aryan languages; Dravidian languages, and more. In some areas where bilingualism is common, this can also be done with languages that are not mutually intelligible if both speakers are assumed to understand the other's language, as is the case in cities like Montreal, as well as of course between two individual speakers of mutually unintelligible languages (which can even include married couples) who know that the other has a good passive knowledge of their own language but poor active command.
- Ethnic marking: the use of a preferred variety, in order to stress one's belonging to a certain cultural or ethnic group. This occurs in Northern Germany, for example, where speakers of Low German and standard German do not converge.
- A third motivation for engaging in an NCD lies on the personal level. According to Giles' Communication Accommodation Theory, interpersonal contacts are negotiations. In a discourse, people seek to create understanding by stressing common features. However, when this will for creating understanding is not present (for example, in cases where the participants feel a strong dislike for each other), they dissociate from each other by stressing the differences. The use of different languages might be the result of such a dissociation strategy. In other contexts, though, NCD may actually imply informality and trust rather than distance.

Sometimes the motivation for engaging in an NCD is misunderstood, especially in contexts where they are uncommon. NCD participants with an ethnic marking strategy might be wrongly interpreted as if they were expressing dislike. This type of misunderstanding is especially common among speakers who come from monolingual areas and find themselves in a bilingual area, where a second language is used alongside their own and NCDs are common.

== See also ==
- Diglossia
- Mutual intelligibility
- Situational code-switching, where communicants mix their common languages
