= National Center for Digitization =

The National Center for Digitization (NCD) is a consortium composed of the most important leading Serbian (and former Yugoslav) cultural and scientific institutions, which analyse problems of digitization of cultural and scientific heritage.

== History ==
The work on the foundation of the National Center for Digitization (NCD) in Serbia started in 2002, with the idea to form a consortium consisting of leading cultural and research institutions involved in digitization of heritage. At the present state, the consortium includes:

- Mathematical institute of the Serbian Academy of Sciences and Arts
- Faculty of Mathematics Belgrade
- National Library of Serbia
- National Museum Belgrade
- Archaeological Institute Belgrade
- Archive of the Republic of Serbia
- Institute for the Protection of Cultural Monuments of Serbia
- Yugoslav Film Archive
- University library Svetozar Markovic

== Objectives ==
The main subjects of cooperation in the NCD are the following:

- Coordination of efforts of institutions involved in the cultural and scientific heritage digitization
- Establishing and promoting a national strategy for the cultural and scientific heritage digitization
- Exploring, adaptation and implementation of international standards and protocols for the cultural and scientific heritage digitization and preservation at the national level. Development of new standards in areas where they do not exist.
- Launching the cultural and scientific heritage digitization and making plans for possible migration process to new formats and technologies for already digitized data

The main activities of the NCD are:

- Annual national conferences New Technologies and Standards:Digitization of National Heritage
- The journal Review of the National Center for Digitization, published both on paper and in electronic form
- Establishing, at the national level, proposals for a basic set of standards in the area of digitization of cultural and scientific heritage
- Developing models of the appropriate distributed information systems and specific software for the realization of the digitization standards
- Collaboration with the similar institutions from abroad, particularly with the South-Eastern European Digitization Initiative (SEEDI).

== Projects ==
- Electronic catalog of cultural monuments in Serbia
- Electronic editions of mathematical journals
- Digital library retro-digitized books and documents
- Digital National library of Serbia

== See also ==
- South-Eastern European Digitization Initiative (SEEDI)
