= Crossing sequence (Turing machines) =

Concept in theoretical computer science

In theoretical computer science, a crossing sequence at boundary i, denoted as $\mathcal{C}_i(x)$ or sometimes $cs(x,i)$, is the sequence of states $q_{i_1},q_{i_2},...,q_{i_k},$ of a Turing machine on input x, such that in this sequence of states, the head crosses between cell i and i + 1 (note that the first crossing is always a right crossing, and the next left, and so on...)

Sometimes, crossing sequence is considered as the sequence of configurations, which represent the three elements: the states, the contents of the tapes and the positions of the heads.

Study of crossing sequences is carried out, e.g., in computational complexity theory.
