= Normalized Google distance =

Semantic similarity measure

The normalized Google distance (NGD) is a semantic similarity measure derived from the number of hits returned by the Google search engine for a given set of keywords. Keywords with the same or similar meanings in a natural language sense tend to be "close" in units of normalized Google distance, while words with dissimilar meanings tend to be farther apart.

Specifically, the NGD between two search terms x and y is

$$\operatorname{NGD}(x,y) = \frac{\max\{\log f(x), \log f(y)\} - \log f(x,y)}
{\log N - \min\{\log f(x), \log f(y)\}}$$

where N is the total number of web pages searched by Google multiplied by the average number of singleton search terms occurring on pages; f(x) and f(y) are the number of hits for search terms x and y, respectively; and f(x, y) is the number of web pages on which both x and y occur.

If the $NGD(x,y)=0$ then x and y are viewed as alike as possible, but if $NGD(x,y)\geq 1$ then x and y are very different. If the two search terms x and y never occur together on the same web page, but do occur separately, the NGD between them is infinite. If both terms always occur together, their NGD is zero.

Example: On 9 April 2013, googling for "Shakespeare" gave 130,000,000 hits; googling for "Macbeth" gave 26,000,000 hits; and googling for "Shakespeare Macbeth" gave 20,800,000 hits. The number of pages indexed by Google was estimated by the number of hits of the search term "the" which was 25,270,000,000 hits. Assuming there are about 1,000 search terms on the average page this gives $N=25,270,000,000,000$. Hence

$$NGD(Shakespeare, Macbeth) = (26.95 - 24.31)/(44.52-24.63)=0.13$$.

"Shakespeare" and "Macbeth" are very much alike according to the relative semantics supplied by Google.

== Introduction ==
The normalized Google distance is derived from the earlier normalized compression distance. Namely, objects can be given literally, like the literal four-letter genome of a mouse, or the literal text of Macbeth by Shakespeare. The similarity of these objects is given by the NCD. For simplicity we take it that all meaning of the object is represented by the literal object itself. Objects can also be given by name, like 'the four-letter genome of a mouse,' or 'the text of Macbeth by Shakespeare.' There are also objects that cannot be given literally, but only by name, and that acquire their meaning from their contexts in background common knowledge in humankind, like "home" or "red". The similarity between names for objects is given by the NGD.

== Google distribution and Google code ==
The probabilities of Google search terms, conceived as the frequencies of page counts returned by Google divided by the number of pages indexed by Google (multiplied by the average number of search terms in those pages), approximate the actual relative frequencies of those search terms as actually used in society. Based on this premise, the relations represented by the normalized Google distance approximately capture the assumed true semantic relations governing the search terms. In the NGD, the World Wide Web and Google are used. Other text corpora include Wikipedia, the King James version of the Bible or the Oxford English Dictionary together with appropriate search engines.

== Properties ==
The following properties are proved in:

- The NGD is roughly in between 0 and $\infty$. It can be slightly negative. For example, "red red" gives about 20% more hits of Google on the World Wide Web than "red". (Mid 2013 there were 4.260.000.000 hits for "red" and 5.500.000.000 hits for "red red". Presently, "red red" now returns far fewer results than "red".) If the $NGD(x,y) \geq 1$ then we view x and y as very dissimilar.
- The NGD is not a metric. The NGD is zero for x and y that are not equal provided x and y do always occur together on the same web page. From the NGD formula we see that it is symmetric. The triangle property is not satisfied by the NGD. However, these results are theoretic. It is hard to come up with practical examples of the World Wide Web using Google that violate the triangle property.

== Applications ==
Applications to colors versus numbers, primes versus non-primes and so are given in, as well as a randomized massive experiment using WordNet categories. In the primes versus non-primes case and the WordNet experiment the NGD method is augmented with a support vector machine classifier. The experiments consist of 25 positive examples and 25 negative ones. The WordNet experiment consisted of 100 random WordNet categories. The NGD method had a success rate of 87.25%. The mean is 0.8725 while the standard deviation was 0.1169. These rates are about agreement with the WordNet categories which represent the knowledge of researchers with PhDs which entered them. It is rare to see agreement less than 75%.
