= Ming Li =

Canadian computer scientist, University of Waterloo

- Education: Wayne State University; Cornell University
- Scientific career
- Fields: Mathematics, Computer science, Bioinformatics
- Workplaces: University of Waterloo; University of California at Santa Barbara; York University; Harvard University; Ohio State University
- Thesis: Lower Bounds in Computational Complexity (1985)
- Doctoral advisor: Juris Hartmanis

Ming Li is a Canadian computer scientist, known for his contributions to Kolmogorov complexity, bioinformatics, machine learning theory, and analysis of algorithms. Li is currently a university professor at the David R. Cheriton School of Computer Science at the University of Waterloo. He holds a Tier I Canada Research Chair in Bioinformatics. In addition to academic achievements, his research has led to the founding of two independent companies.

== Education ==
Li received a Master of Science degree (Computer Science) from Wayne State University in 1980 and earned a Doctor of Philosophy degree (Computer Science) under the supervision of Juris Hartmanis, from Cornell University in 1985. His post-doctoral research was conducted at Harvard University under the supervision of Leslie Valiant.

== Career ==
Paul Vitanyi and Li pioneered Kolmogorov complexity theory and applications, and co-authored the textbook An Introduction to Kolmogorov Complexity and Its Applications.

In 2000, Li founded Bioinformatics Solutions Inc, a biomedical software company, for tandem mass spectrometry protein characterization. Originally developed to identify novel peptides through de novo peptide sequencing, the technology has been adapted to address antibody characterization. Other products have included protein structure prediction, general purpose homology searching, and next generation sequencing glyco-peptide research.

In 2013, Li co-founded RSVP Technologies Inc, an artificial intelligence company. Utilizing deep neural networks, and natural language processing, RSVP Technologies has created software to automatically listen and respond to questions in Cantonese, Mandarin, and English. The software has been applied on voice-control navigation systems, personal tour guide applications, robotics, and other intelligent electronics.

== Awards and honours ==
- 1996 - E.W.R. Steacie Memorial Fellowship, NSERC
- 1997 - Award of Merit, FCCP
- 2001 - Killam Research Fellowship, Canada Council for the Arts
- 2002 - Canada Research Chair in Bioinformatics, Tier I
- 2006 - Fellow, Institute of Electrical and Electronics Engineers, Pioneer Award
- 2006 - Fellow, Association for Computing Machinery
- 2006 - Fellow, Royal Society of Canada
- 2009 - Premier’s Discovery Award (Innovation Leadership)
- 2010 - Killam Prize
- 2021 - Fellow of the International Society for Computational Biology.
