= Gammerman =

Gammerman is a surname. Notable people with the surname include:

- Alexander Gammerman (born 1944), British-Soviet computer scientist and statistician
- Ira Gammerman (1927–2019), American judge
