= Weight-of-conflict conjecture =

Weight-of-conflict conjecture was proposed by Glenn Shafer in his book on the Dempster–Shafer theory titled A Mathematical Theory of Evidence.

It states that if $Q_1$ and $Q_2$ are commonality functions for two separable support functions $S_1$ and $S_2$ defined over $\Theta$, and $Q_1(A) \le Q_2(A)$, then the corresponding weights of conflict satisfy the condition $W_{S_1} \ge W_{S_2}$.

$$\forall A \subseteq \Theta : Q_1(A) \le Q_2(A) \implies W_{S_1} \ge W_{S_2}$$
