= Vladimir Vovk =

British computer scientist

- Born: 1960; Ukraine
- Education: Moscow State University
- Occupation: Computer scientist
- Known for: Conformal prediction
- Academic career
- Fields: Machine learning Statistics
- Institutions: Royal Holloway, University of London
- Doctoral advisor: Andrey Kolmogorov, Alexei Semenov

Vladimir Vovk is a British computer scientist and professor at Royal Holloway University of London. He is the co-inventor of conformal prediction and is known for his contributions to the concept of e-values. He is the co-director of the Centre for Machine Learning at Royal Holloway University of London, and a Fellow of the Royal Statistical Society.

== Career ==
Vovk started working as a researcher in the Russian Academy of Sciences, then became a Fellow in the Center for Advanced Study in the Behavioral Sciences at Stanford University. He was appointed as a professor of Computer Science at Royal Holloway and Bedford New College, where he currently serves as co-director of the Centre for Machine Learning.

Early in his career, Vovk was heavily involved in the development of the foundations of probability, along with Glenn Shafer. Their work has resulted in a book, Probability and Finance: It's Only a Game!, published in 2001, which was subsequently translated into Japanese in 2006 by Masayuki Kumon and edited by Kei Takeuchi. In 2005, he co-invented the Conformal prediction framework with Alexander Gammerman.

Vovk has delivered speeches all around the world. In 2021, he was invited to deliver a series of memorial lectures to Prasanta Chandra Mahalanobis in India. On the 20-year anniversary of The Society for Imprecise Probability (SIPTA) in 2019, he was invited to deliver a talk on "Game-theoretic foundations for imprecise probabilities" in Belgium. In 2016, he delivered a seminar about "Probability-free theory of continuous martingales" at Imperial College in the UK. In 2014, he was one of three invited speakers at the first and only IMS/COLT joint workshop at University of Hawai'i in the USA. In 2023, he was a plenary speaker at the Association for Algorithmic Learning Theory conference in Singapore. In 2023, he also delivered the David Sprott Distinguished Lecture at University of Waterloo, Canada. In 2025, he delivered a seminar for the Isaac Newton Institute for Mathematical Sciences, UK.

In 2026, he was awarded the 2026 Frontiers of Science Award from the International Congress of Basic Sciences (ICBS), shared with his co-author Ruodu Wang, professor at University of Waterloo.

Vovk has written 9 books, more than 280 research papers, and has an estimated h-index of 53. He holds fellowship positions at Stanford University (USA), Arizona State University (USA) and Yandex (Russia).

== Selected books ==
- Game-theoretic foundations for probability and finance (2019), Wiley, ISBN 0470903058.
- Conformal Prediction for Reliable Machine Learning: Theory, Adaptations and Applications (2014), Morgan Kaufmann, ISBN 0123985374.
- Algorithmic Learning in a Random World (2005), Springer, ISBN 0387001522.
- Probability and finance: it's only a game (2001), Wiley, ISBN 0471402265.
