= Reversibility =

Reversibility can refer to:

- Time reversibility, a property of some mathematical or physical processes and systems for which time-reversed dynamics are well defined

- Reversible diffusion, an example of a reversible stochastic process

- Reversible process (thermodynamics), a process or cycle such that the net change at each stage in the combined entropy of the system and its surroundings is zero
- Reversible reaction, a chemical reaction for which the position of the chemical equilibrium is very sensitive to the imposed physical conditions; so the reaction can be made to run either forwards or in reverse by changing those conditions
- Reversible computing, logical reversibility of a computation; a computational step for which a well-defined inverse exists
- Reversible error, a legal mistake invalidating a trial
- Reversible garment, a garment that can be worn two ways
- Piaget's theory of cognitive development, in which mental reversibility is part of the concrete operational stage, the understanding that numbers and objects can change and then return to their original state
- Reversible playing card, a playing card that may be read either way up
