= Jean Ville =

French mathematician

Jean Ville, also known under the names Jean-André Ville et André Ville, born 24 June 1910 in Marseille, died 22 January 1989 in Blois, was a French mathematician. He is known for having proved an extension of von Neumman's minimax theorem, as well as contributions in the fields of statistics and economics. He was one of the pioneers of the theory of martingales.

== Life ==
Jean André Ville was the son of Jean Baptiste Ville (1871-1927) and Marie Vernet (1876-1955), both from families from Mosset in Pyrénées-Orientales. His first name was that of his godfather and uncle, Jean Ville, the second, that of his grandfather, André Vernet. André was the first name used in the family, but in his professional life, he used Jean. Bernard d'Orgeval, a classmate, writes in the directory of former students of the ENS 1992 "very discreet about his private life, discretion marked by the use of the first name Jean in his scientific and administrative career, while in the family he was André".

He was a former student of the lycée Thiers of Marseille and the École normale supérieure (Promo 1929), of which he entered first.

Ville's inequality is named for him, after he proved it in 1939. Ville's work was foundational in the development of e-values.

== Publications ==
- Applications de la théorie des probabilités aux jeux de hasard, d'Émile Borel et Jean Ville (1938)
