= METTL26 =

Protein-coding gene in the species Homo sapiens

Identifiers
- Aliases: METTL26, C16orf13, JFP2, Chromosome 16 open reading frame 13, methyltransferase like 26
- External IDs: MGI: 1915597; HomoloGene: 16917; GeneCards: METTL26; OMA:METTL26 - orthologs

Gene location (Human)
Chr.	Chromosome 16 (human)
Band	16p13.3	Start	634,427 bp
Band	16p13.3	End	636,366 bp

Gene location (Mouse)
Chr.	Chromosome 17 (mouse)
Band	17|17 A3.3	Start	26,094,048 bp
Band	17|17 A3.3	End	26,096,143 bp
RNA expression pattern
Bgee	Human / Mouse (ortholog); Top expressed in: apex of heart; cingulate gyrus; anterior cingulate cortex; Brodmann area 9; right frontal lobe; amygdala; putamen; nucleus accumbens; prefrontal cortex; caudate nucleus / Top expressed in: right kidney; proximal tubule; human kidney; left lobe of liver; otolith organ; utricle; adrenal gland; facial motor nucleus; islet of Langerhans; yolk sac; More reference expression data
BioGPS	n/a
Orthologs
Species	Human	Mouse
Entrez	84326	68347
Ensembl	ENSG00000130731	ENSMUSG00000025731
UniProt	Q96S19	Q9DCS2
RefSeq (mRNA)	NM_001040160; NM_001040161; NM_001040162; NM_001040163; NM_001040164 NM_001040165; NM_001040166; NM_001288710; NM_032366	NM_026686
RefSeq (protein)	NP_001035250; NP_001035251; NP_001035252; NP_001035255; NP_001275639 NP_115742	NP_080962
Location (UCSC)	Chr 16: 0.63 – 0.64 Mb	Chr 17: 26.09 – 26.1 Mb
PubMed search
- Wikidata
View/Edit Human	View/Edit Mouse

METTL26, previously designated C16orf13, is a protein-coding gene for Methyltransferase Like 26, also known as JFP2. Though the function of this gene is unknown, various data have revealed that it is expressed at high levels in various cancerous tissues. Underexpression of this gene has also been linked to disease consequences in humans.

== Gene ==
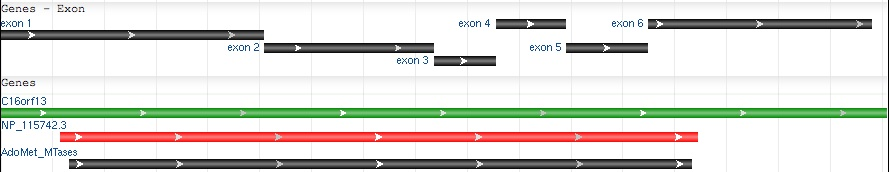
Exon breakdown of C16orf13 transcript variant 1. The AdoMet-MTase domain is also included in the diagram.

METTL26 is located on the short arm of chromosome 16 in humans, in the thirteenth open reading frame. There are five transcript variants of this gene, named 1, 2, 3, 4, and 7. The longest cDNA transcript (transcript variant 1) contains 854 base pairs. This transcript is composed of six exons, all of which contribute to the major superfamily included in the protein, the methyltransferases superfamily. The primary transcript of this gene is 1,919 base pairs long.

=== Species distribution ===
Dot plot showing sequence similarity at the 5' and 3' ends of the Human gene and its Chimpanzee ortholog.

Using the Dotlet program, a dot plot was constructed comparing the Human gene with its Chimpanzee ortholog.

The plot indicates sequence conservation at the beginning and end of the gene, suggesting conservation and similarity in the 5' and 3' untranslated regions.

This sequence similarity in the 5’ UTR and 3’ UTR does not extend past mammalian species, and shows almost no similarity in a Dot Plot of the Human gene with distantly related species, such as Xenopus tropicalis.

A multiple sequence alignment conducted using the SDSC Biology Workbench reveals little sequence similarity among species more distantly related than primates in the upstream region of the gene. Near the start of transcription site in the human C16orf13 gene, there is high conservation among the primates in which upstream data was available, specifically the human, orangutan, and rhesus monkey C16orf13 gene orthologs. High sequence similarity among primates is evident throughout the promoter region, the 5' UTR, and the C16orf13 gene.

The graph below shows selected gene orthologs for C16orf13 transcript variant 1. These data are collected from NCBI BLAST.

Species	Organism Common name	Gene Common name	NCBI accession number	Sequence identity	Expected value	Sequence length (bp)	Time since split from humans, MYA (Data from TimeTree.org)
Homo sapiens	Human	C16orf13	NM_032366.3	100%	0	854	0
Pan troglodytes	Chimpanzee	LOC467858	NM_032366.3	98%	0	784	6.4
Canis lupus familiaris	Dog	C6H16orf13	XM_547214.3	88%	0	865	94.4
Mus musculus	Mouse	0610011F06Rik	NM_026686.2	86%	0	825	92.4
Xenopus (Silurana) tropicalis	Western clawed frog	c16orf13	NM_001039734.1	BLAST search found no significant similarity	BLAST search found no significant similarity	993	371.2

=== Tissue distribution ===
The human expression profile from NCBI UniGene suggests that this gene has widespread expression in many different tissues in the body. This expression profile suggests that this gene is a “housekeeping gene,” one that has important effects in all cells, regardless of tissue. The highest levels of expression appear to be in the adrenal gland, lung, and parathyroid. There are many additional sites besides these highest three where the gene is expressed in high levels. There seems to be no real similarity in the few tissues where the gene is not expressed. This expression data does not seem to give any clues into specific function, except to suggest that the gene is involved in a “housekeeping” function of nearly all cells.

=== Gene neighborhood ===
Approximate location of the C16orf13 gene on Chromosome 16

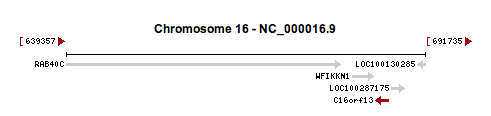
Gene neighborhood of C16orf13

The C16orf13 gene is located near the end of chromosome 16, potentially subject to deletion mutations.

The surrounding genes of the C16orf13 gene include hypothetical protein LOC100287175 and LOC100138285 to the right and RAB40C and WFIKKN1 to the left. This gene is located on the minus strand, along with LOC100138285. The other surrounding genes are oriented in the opposite way on the plus strand. The gene neighborhood is represented in the schematic below, originally from NCBI Gene.

== Protein ==
The protein that this gene codes for is known as UPF0585, where UPF signals unknown protein function. There are five isoforms of this protein, corresponding to the five splice variants of the gene. The isoforms are named a, b, c, d, and g As mentioned above, the conserved domain detected in a BLAST search of this amino acid sequence is a methyltransferase superfamily.

=== Conservation ===
A multiple sequence alignment conducted using the protein tools in the SDSC Biology Workbench reveals some sequence similarity among distantly related protein orthologs, as far back as archaea, in the region known to code for the methyltransferase domain. The methyltransferase superfamily portion of the protein appears more highly conserved among many of the more closely related orthologous proteins in a diverse array of species.

=== Species distribution ===
The C16orf13 has homologs in many species, including distant orthologs in fungi and plants. There are no known paralogs of this protein This gene and its protein are very highly conserved in primates and mammals, particularly in the functional methyltransferase domain.

The graph below shows selected protein orthologs for C16orf13 transcript variant 1. These data are collected from NCBI BLAST.

Species	Organism Common name	Protein Common name	NCBI accession number	Sequence identity	Expected value	Sequence length (aa)	Time since split from humans, MYA (Data from TimeTree.org)
Homo sapiens	Human	UPF0585, isoform a	NP_115742.3	100%	0	204	0
Pan troglodytes	Chimpanzee	LOC467858	XP_001154838.1	98%	1E-150	204	6.4
Canis lupus familiaris	Dog	LOC490093	XP_547214.3	91%	4E-141	204	94.4
Mus musculus	Mouse	0610011F06Rik	NP_080962.1	87%	5E-134	204	92.4
Xenopus (Silurana) tropicalis	Western clawed frog	UPF0585 protein C16orf13 homolog	NP_001034823.2	58%	1E-82	203	371.2

=== Predicted properties ===
Predicted secondary structure of the protein based on results obtained using CHOFAS, GOR4, and PELE programs on SDSC Biology Workbench. The most confident areas (those that appeared in multiple programs) are boxed in addition to highlighted. The dashes in the sequences represent exon splice sites.

The protein secondary structure can be predicted using algorithms to predict the occurrence of alpha helices and beta sheets within the protein. An analysis of the protein structure was conducted using the CHOFAS, GOR4, and PELE algorithms in the SDSC Biology Workbench. The analyses were combined and included in the adjacent diagram. Only structures that appeared in more than one output were included.

=== Interactions ===
There are few known interactions for this protein. No interactions were found in the GeneCards database or in the MINT database. A STRING search resulted in two gene outputs. These two gene interactions, though, are both in the evidence category of gene neighborhood, which does not necessarily suggest that these genes are interacting in any meaningful way, or are even expressed at the same time. There is no strong evidence, currently, for interactions with this protein.

== Disease linkage ==
Data from microarray experiments has linked over expression of this gene to cancer in various tissues, particularly breast and gastric cancer. In addition, under expression of this gene is also linked to disease, particularly connective tissue disease, nutritional and metabolic disorders, and digestive disorders. The canSAR Workbench database reveals microarray data that may link over or under expression of the C16orf13 gene to various carcinomas
