= Vladimir Alekseev =

Vladimir Alekseev may refer to:

- Vladimir Alekseev (admiral) (1912–1999), Russian admiral
- Vladimir Alekseyev (general) (born 1961), Russian general
- Vladimir Alekseev (mathematician) (1932–1980), Russian mathematician
