= Vladimir Alekseev (mathematician) =

Russian mathematician

Vladimir Mikhailovich Alekseev (Владимир Михайлович Алексеев, sometimes transliterated as "Alexeyev" or "Alexeev", 17 June 1932, Bykovo, Ramensky District, Moscow Oblast – 1 December 1980) was a Russian mathematician who specialized in celestial mechanics and dynamical systems.

He attended secondary school in Moscow at one of the special schools of mathematics affiliated with Moscow State University and participated in several mathematical olympiads. From 1950 he studied at the Faculty of Mathematics and Mechanics at the Moscow State University, where he worked as a student of Andrei Kolmogorov on the asymptotic behavior in the three-body problem of celestial mechanics. Already as an undergraduate, Alekseev proved significant new results on quasi-random motion associated with the three-body problem. This was the subject of his dissertation for the Russian candidate degree (Ph.D.) and then his dissertation in 1969 for the Russian doctorate (higher doctoral degree). From 1957 he taught at Moscow State University.

In 1970 Alekseev was an Invited Speaker with talk Sur l´allure finale du mouvement dans le problème de trois corps at the ICM in Nice.

Over a 20-year period, he conducted 3 ongoing seminars: with Yakov Sinai on dynamical systems, with V. A. Egorov on celestial mechanics, and with M. Zelikin and V. M. Tikhomirov on variational problems and optimal control.

== Selected publications ==
- Symbolic dynamics (Russian), Kiev 1976
- with V. M. Tikhomirov, S. Fomin: Optimal Control, New York: Consultants Bureau 1987 (trans. from the Russian by V. M. Volosov)
- "A theorem on an integral inequality and some of its applications" by V. M. Alekseev in Thirteen papers on dynamical systems by V. M. Alekseev & 14 other authors, American Mathematical Society 1981 doi:10.1090/trans2/089
- with E. M. Galeev, V. M. Tikhomirov: Recueil de problèmes d'optimisation (French), Moscow, MIR 1987
