= Boris Vladimirovich Gnedenko =

Soviet-Russian mathematician (1912–1995)

- Бори́с Влади́мирович Гнеде́нко
- Born: January 1, 1912; Simbirsk, Russian Empire
- Died: December 27, 1995 (aged 83); Moscow
- Burial place: Kuntsevo Cemetery in Moscow
- Citizenship: Soviet Union
- Education: Saratov State University (1930)
- Occupations: Scientist; Mathematician
- Years active: 1930–1995
- Known for: works with Andrey Kolmogorov and personal contributions in probability theory, extreme value theory, Fisher–Tippett–Gnedenko theorem
- Spouse: Natalia K. Gnedenko
- Children: 2 sons
- Awards: USSR State Prize (1979)
- Boris Vladimirovich Gnedenko's voice Recorded 19 June 1976

Boris Vladimirovich Gnedenko (Russian: Бори́с Влади́мирович Гнеде́нко; January 1, 1912 – December 27, 1995) was a Soviet mathematician and a student of Andrey Kolmogorov. He was born in Simbirsk (now Ulyanovsk), Russia, and died in Moscow. He is perhaps best known for his work with Kolmogorov, and his contributions to the study of probability theory, particularly extreme value theory, with such results as the Fisher–Tippett–Gnedenko theorem. Gnedenko was appointed as Head of the Physics, Mathematics and Chemistry Section of the Ukrainian Academy of Sciences in 1949, and became Director of the NASU Institute of Mathematics in 1955.

Gnedenko was a leading member of the Russian school of probability theory and statistics. He also worked on applications of statistics to reliability and quality control in manufacturing. He wrote a history of mathematics in Russia (published 1946), and with O. B. Sheynin the section on the history of probability theory in the history of mathematics by Kolmogorov and Adolph P. Yushkevich (published 1992). In 1958, he was a plenary speaker at the International Congress of Mathematicians in Edinburgh with a talk entitled "Limit theorems of probability theory".

== Books ==
- Gnedenko, Boris V.; Kolmogorov, A. N. (2021) [First published 1954]. Limit distributions for sums of independent random variables. Translated by Chung, K. L. ISBN 978-1684225798.
- Gnedenko, Boris V.; Khinchin, A. Ya. (1962). An elementary introduction to the theory of probability. Translated by Boron, Leo F. Mineola, N.Y.: Dover.
- Gnedenko, Boris V. (1969). The theory of probability. Translated by Yankovsky, George. Moscow: Mir Publishers.
- Gnedenko, Boris V.; Belyayev, Yu. K.; Solovyev, A. D. (2015) [First published 1969]. Barlow, Richard E. (ed.). Mathematical methods of reliability theory. Translated by Scripta Technica. NY: Academic Press. ISBN 978-1483253787.
- Gnedenko, Boris V.; Kovalenko, I. N. (1989). Introduction to queueing theory. Translated by Kotz, Samuel. Boston: Birkhäuser. ISBN 978-3764334239.
