= Ville's inequality =

Probabilistic inequality

In probability theory, Ville's inequality provides an upper bound on the probability that a supermartingale exceeds a certain value. The inequality is named after Jean Ville, who proved it in 1939. The inequality has applications in statistical testing; it can be used to convert e-processes into $\alpha$-level sequential tests while controlling Type-I error.

== Statement ==
Let $X_0, X_1, X_2, \dots$ be a non-negative supermartingale. Then, for any real number $a > 0,$

$$\operatorname{P} \left[ \sup_{n \ge 0} X_n \ge a \right] \le \frac{\operatorname{E}[X_0]}{a} \ .$$

The inequality is a generalization of Markov's inequality.
