= Etemadi's inequality =

Inequality in probability theory

In probability theory, Etemadi's inequality is a so-called "maximal inequality", an inequality that gives a bound on the probability that the partial sums of a finite collection of independent random variables exceed some specified bound. The result is due to Nasrollah Etemadi.

== Statement of the inequality ==
Let X_{1}, ..., X_{n} be independent real-valued random variables defined on some common probability space, and let α ≥ 0. Let S_{k} denote the partial sum

$$S_k = X_1 + \cdots + X_k.\,$$

Then

$$\Pr \Bigl( \max_{1 \leq k \leq n} | S_k | \geq 3 \alpha \Bigr) \leq 3 \max_{1 \leq k \leq n} \Pr \bigl( | S_k | \geq \alpha \bigr).$$

== Remark ==
Suppose that the random variables X_{k} have common expected value zero. Apply Chebyshev's inequality to the right-hand side of Etemadi's inequality and replace α by α / 3. The result is Kolmogorov's inequality with an extra factor of 27 on the right-hand side:

$$\Pr \Bigl( \max_{1 \leq k \leq n} | S_k | \geq \alpha \Bigr) \leq \frac{27}{\alpha^2} \operatorname{var} (S_n).$$
