= Beta wavelet =

Continuous wavelets of compact support alpha can be built, which are related to the beta distribution. The process is derived from probability distributions using blur derivative. These new wavelets have just one cycle, so they are termed unicycle wavelets. They can be viewed as a soft variety of Haar wavelets whose shape is fine-tuned by two parameters $\alpha$ and $\beta$. Closed-form expressions for beta wavelets and scale functions as well as their spectra are derived. Their importance is due to the Central Limit Theorem by Gnedenko and Kolmogorov applied for compactly supported signals.

== Beta distribution ==
The beta distribution is a continuous probability distribution defined over the interval $0\leq t\leq 1$. It is characterised by a couple of parameters, namely $\alpha$ and $\beta$ according to:

$P(t)=\frac{1}{B(\alpha ,\beta )}t^{\alpha -1}\cdot (1-t)^{\beta -1},\quad 1\leq \alpha ,\beta \leq +\infty$.

The normalising factor is $B(\alpha ,\beta )=\frac{\Gamma (\alpha )\cdot \Gamma (\beta )}{\Gamma (\alpha +\beta )}$,

where $\Gamma (\cdot )$ is the generalised factorial function of Euler and $B(\cdot ,\cdot )$ is the Beta function.

== Gnedenko-Kolmogorov central limit theorem revisited ==
Let $p_{i}(t)$ be a probability density of the random variable $t_{i}$, $i=1,2,3..N$ i.e.

$p_{i}(t)\ge 0$, $(\forall t)$ and $\int_{-\infty }^{+\infty }p_{i}(t)dt=1$.

Suppose that all variables are independent.

The mean and the variance of a given random variable $t_{i}$ are, respectively

$m_{i}=\int_{-\infty }^{+\infty }\tau \cdot p_{i}(\tau )d\tau ,$ $\sigma _{i}^{2}=\int_{-\infty }^{+\infty }(\tau -m_{i})^{2}\cdot p_{i}(\tau )d\tau$.

The mean and variance of $t$ are therefore $m=\sum_{i=1}^{N}m_{i}$ and $\sigma^2 =\sum_{i=1}^{N}\sigma _{i}^{2}$.

The density $p(t)$ of the random variable corresponding to the sum $t=\sum_{i=1}^{N}t_{i}$ is given by the

Central Limit Theorem for distributions of compact support (Gnedenko and Kolmogorov).

Let $\{p_{i}(t)\}$ be distributions such that $Supp\{(p_{i}(t))\}=(a_{i},b_{i})(\forall i)$.

Let $a=\sum_{i=1}^{N}a_{i}<+\infty$, and $b=\sum_{i=1}^{N}b_{i}<+\infty$.

Without loss of generality assume that $a=0$ and $b=1$.

The random variable $t$ holds, as $N\rightarrow \infty$, $p(t)\approx$
$$\begin{cases} {k \cdot t^{\alpha }(1-t)^{\beta}}, \\otherwise \end{cases}$$

where $\alpha =\frac{m(m-m^{2}-\sigma ^{2})}{\sigma ^{2}},$ and $\beta =\frac{(1-m)(\alpha +1)}{m}.$

== Beta wavelets ==
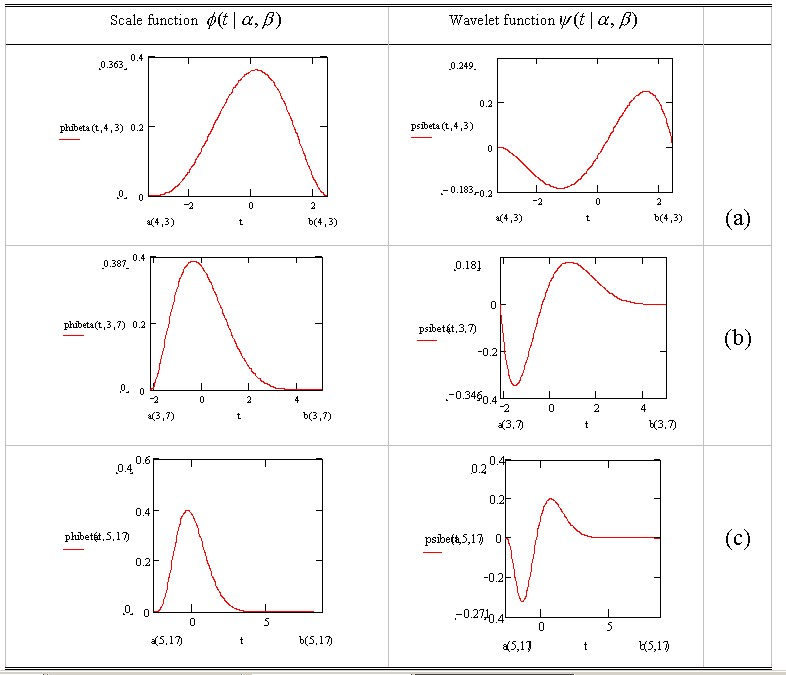
Figure. Unicyclic beta scale function and wavelet for different parameters: a) $\alpha =4$, $\beta =3$ b) $\alpha =3$, $\beta =7$ c) $\alpha =5$, $\beta =17$.

Since $P(\cdot |\alpha ,\beta )$ is unimodal, the wavelet generated by

$\psi _{beta}(t|\alpha ,\beta )=(-1)\frac{dP(t|\alpha ,\beta )}{dt}$ has only one-cycle (a negative half-cycle and a positive half-cycle).

The main features of beta wavelets of parameters $\alpha$ and $\beta$ are:

$Supp(\psi )=[ -\sqrt{\frac{\alpha}{\beta}}\sqrt{\alpha + \beta +1},\sqrt{ \frac{\beta }{\alpha }} \sqrt{\alpha +\beta +1}]=[a,b].$

$lengthSupp(\psi )=T(\alpha ,\beta )=(\alpha +\beta )\sqrt{\frac{\alpha +\beta +1}{\alpha \beta }}.$

The parameter $R=b/|a| =\beta / \alpha$ is referred to as “cyclic balance”, and is defined as the ratio between the lengths of the causal and non-causal piece of the wavelet. The instant of transition $t_{zerocross}$ from the first to the second half cycle is given by

$t_{zerocross}=\frac{(\alpha -\beta )}{(\alpha +\beta -2)}\sqrt{\frac{\alpha +\beta +1}{\alpha \beta }}.$

The (unimodal) scale function associated with the wavelets is given by

$\phi _{beta}(t|\alpha ,\beta )=\frac{1}{B(\alpha ,\beta )T^{\alpha +\beta -1}}\cdot (t-a)^{\alpha -1}\cdot (b-t)^{\beta -1},$ $a\leq t\leq b$.

A closed-form expression for first-order beta wavelets can easily be derived. Within their support,

$\psi_{beta}(t|\alpha ,\beta ) =\frac{-1}{B(\alpha ,\beta )T^{\alpha +\beta -1}} \cdot [\frac{\alpha -1}{t-a}-\frac{\beta -1}{b-t}] \cdot(t-a)^{\alpha -1} \cdot(b-t)^{\beta -1}$

== Beta wavelet spectrum ==
The beta wavelet spectrum can be derived in terms of the Kummer hypergeometric function.

Let $\psi _{beta}(t|\alpha ,\beta )\leftrightarrow \Psi _{BETA}(\omega |\alpha ,\beta )$ denote the Fourier transform pair associated with the wavelet.

This spectrum is also denoted by $\Psi _{BETA}(\omega)$ for short. It can be proved by applying properties of the Fourier transform that

$\Psi _{BETA}(\omega ) =-j\omega \cdot M(\alpha ,\alpha +\beta ,-j\omega (\alpha +\beta )\sqrt{\frac{\alpha +\beta +1}{\alpha \beta}})\cdot exp\{(j\omega \sqrt{\frac{\alpha (\alpha +\beta +1)}{\beta }})\}$

where $M(\alpha ,\alpha +\beta ,j\nu )=\frac{\Gamma (\alpha +\beta )}{\Gamma (\alpha )\cdot \Gamma (\beta )}\cdot \int_{0}^{1}e^{j\nu t}t^{\alpha -1}(1-t)^{\beta -1}dt$.

Only symmetrical $(\alpha =\beta )$ cases have zeroes in the spectrum. A few asymmetric $(\alpha \neq \beta )$ beta wavelets are shown in Fig. Inquisitively, they are parameter-symmetrical in the sense that they hold $|\Psi _{BETA}(\omega |\alpha ,\beta )|=|\Psi _{BETA}(\omega |\beta ,\alpha )|.$

Higher derivatives may also generate further beta wavelets. Higher order beta wavelets are defined by $\psi _{beta}(t|\alpha ,\beta )=(-1)^{N}\frac{d^{N}P(t|\alpha ,\beta )}{dt^{N}}.$

This is henceforth referred to as an $N$-order beta wavelet. They exist for order $N\leq Min(\alpha ,\beta )-1$. After some algebraic handling, their closed-form expression can be found:

$\Psi _{beta}(t|\alpha ,\beta ) =\frac{(-1)^{N}}{B(\alpha ,\beta ) \cdot T^{\alpha +\beta -1}} \sum_{n=0}^{N}sgn(2n-N)\cdot \frac{\Gamma (\alpha )}{\Gamma (\alpha -(N-n))}(t-a)^{\alpha -1-(N-n)} \cdot \frac{\Gamma (\beta )}{\Gamma (\beta -n)}(b-t)^{\beta -1-n}.$

An $N^{th}$-order beta wavelet has $N$ vanishing moments, and is therefore insensitive to polynomial trends of degree up to $N-1$.

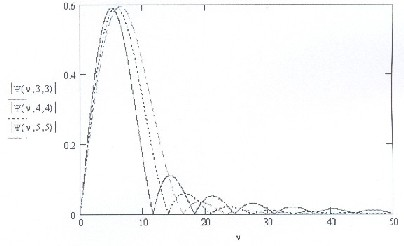

Magnitude of the spectrum $\Psi_{\mathrm{BETA}}(\omega)$ of symmetric beta wavelets: $\alpha=\beta=3$, $\alpha=\beta=4$, and $\alpha=\beta=5$.

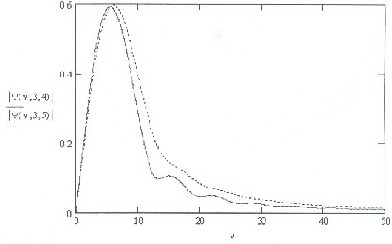

Magnitude of the spectrum $\Psi_{\mathrm{BETA}}(\omega)$ of asymmetric beta wavelets: $\alpha=3,\ \beta=4$ and $\alpha=3,\ \beta=5$.

== Application ==
Wavelet theory is applicable to several subjects. All wavelet transforms may be considered forms of time-frequency representation for continuous-time (analog) signals and so are related to harmonic analysis. Almost all practically useful discrete wavelet transforms use discrete-time filter banks. Similarly, Beta wavelet and its derivative are utilized in several real-time engineering applications such as image compression, bio-medical signal compression, image recognition [9] etc.
