= Glenn Shafer =

American mathematician, born 1946

Glenn Shafer (born November 21, 1946) is an American mathematician and statistician. He is the co-creator of Dempster–Shafer theory. He is a university professor and a board of governors professor at Rutgers University, as well as a former dean of its business school.

== Early life and education ==
Shafer grew up on a farm near Caney, Kansas. He earned a bachelor's degree in mathematics from Princeton University, then entered the Peace Corps, serving in Afghanistan. He returned to Princeton, earning a PhD in mathematical statistics in 1973 under Geoffrey Watson.

== Career ==
Shafer taught at Princeton and the University of Kansas, joining the faculty of Rutgers Business School – Newark and New Brunswick in 1992. From 2011 to 2014, he served as dean of the business school of the university.

During the 1970s and 1980s Shafer expanded a theory first introduced by the Harvard professor, Arthur P. Dempster, to create Dempster–Shafer theory, also described as, the theory of belief functions or evidence theory. It is a general framework for reasoning with uncertainty, allowing one to combine evidence from different sources and to arrive at a degree of belief (represented by a mathematical object called belief function) that takes into account all the available evidence. The theory and its extensions have been of particular interest to the artificial intelligence community.

More recently Shafer worked with Vladimir Vovk to develop a game-theoretic framework for probability. That work produced a 2001 book, Probability and Finance: It's Only a Game!. A joint research group between Rutgers and Royal Holloway, University of London has produced more than 50 working papers on the subject.

=== Principal publications ===
- Shafer, Glenn, A Mathematical Theory of Evidence, Princeton University Press, 1976.
- Shafer, Glenn, and Vovk, Vladimir, Probability and Finance: It's Only a Game!, John Wiley and Sons, 2001.
- Shafer, Glenn, and Vovk, Vladimir, Game‐Theoretic Foundations for Probability and Finance, John Wiley and Sons, 2019.

== Recognition ==
Shafer is designated as a Board of Governors Professor at Rutgers. The Prague University of Economics and Business recognized him with an honorary doctorate in 2009. He has been a Fulbright Fellow and a Guggenheim Fellow. He was elected a Fellow of the Association for the Advancement of Artificial Intelligence in 1992.

== Personal life ==
He is married to retired Princeton history professor, author, and artist Nell Irvin Painter.
