= Reversible diffusion =

In mathematics, a reversible diffusion is a specific example of a reversible stochastic process. Reversible diffusions have an elegant characterization due to the Russian mathematician Andrey Nikolaevich Kolmogorov.

== Kolmogorov's characterization of reversible diffusions ==
Let B denote a d-dimensional standard Brownian motion; let b : R^{d} → R^{d} be a Lipschitz continuous vector field. Let X : [0, +∞) × Ω → R^{d} be an Itō diffusion defined on a probability space (Ω, Σ, P) and solving the Itō stochastic differential equation $\mathrm{d} X_{t} = b(X_{t}) \, \mathrm{d} t + \mathrm{d} B_{t}$ with square-integrable initial condition, i.e. X_{0} ∈ L^{2}(Ω, Σ, P; R^{d}). Then the following are equivalent:

- The process X is reversible with stationary distribution μ on R^{d}.
- There exists a scalar potential Φ : R^{d} → R such that b = −∇Φ, μ has Radon–Nikodym derivative $\frac{\mathrm{d} \mu (x)}{\mathrm{d} x} = \exp \left( - 2 \Phi (x) \right)$ and $\int_{\mathbf{R}^{d}} \exp \left( - 2 \Phi (x) \right) \, \mathrm{d} x = 1.$

(Of course, the condition that b be the negative of the gradient of Φ only determines Φ up to an additive constant; this constant may be chosen so that exp(−2Φ(·)) is a probability density function with integral 1.)
