= Sergei Fomin =

Soviet mathematician

Sergei Vasilyevich Fomin (Russian: Серге́й Васи́льевич Фоми́н; 9 December 1917 – 17 August 1975) was a Soviet mathematician who was co-author with Andrey Kolmogorov of Introductory real analysis, and co-author with Israel Gelfand of Calculus of Variations (1963), both books that are widely read in Russian and in English.

Fomin entered Moscow State University at the age of 16. His first paper was published at 19 on infinite abelian groups. After his graduation he worked with Kolmogorov. He was drafted during World War II, after which he returned to Moscow.

When the war ended Fomin returned to Moscow State University and joined Andrey Tikhonov's department. In 1951 he was awarded his habilitation for a dissertation on dynamical systems with invariant measure. Two years later he was appointed a professor. Later in life, he became involved with mathematical aspects of biology.

The American mathematician Paul Halmos wrote the following about Fomin:

Some of the mathematical interests of Sergei Vasilovich were always close to some of mine (measure and ergodic theory); he supervised the translation of a couple of my books into Russian. We had corresponded before we met, and it was a pleasure to shake hands with a man instead of reading a letter. Three or four years later he came to visit me in Hawaii, and it was a pleasure to see him enjoy, in contrast to Moscow, the warm sunshine.

Fomin died in Vladivostok.
