= Kolmogorov's inequality =

Inequality in probability theory

In probability theory, Kolmogorov's inequality is a so-called "maximal inequality" that gives a bound on the probability that the partial sums of a finite collection of independent random variables exceed some specified bound.

== Statement of the inequality ==
Let X_{1}, ..., X_{n} : Ω → R be independent random variables defined on a common probability space (Ω, F, Pr), with expected value E[X_{k}] = 0 and variance Var[X_{k}] < +∞ for k = 1, ..., n. Then, for each λ > 0,

$$\Pr \left(\max_{1\leq k\leq n} | S_k |\geq\lambda\right)\leq \frac{1}{\lambda^2} \operatorname{Var} [S_n] \equiv \frac{1}{\lambda^2}\sum_{k=1}^n \operatorname{Var}[X_k]=\frac{1}{\lambda^2}\sum_{k=1}^{n}\text{E}[X_k^2],$$

where S_{k} = X_{1} + ... + X_{k}.

The convenience of this result is that we can bound the worst case deviation of a random walk at any point of time using its value at the end of time interval.

== Proof ==
The following argument employs discrete martingales. As argued in the discussion of Doob's martingale inequality, the sequence $S_1, S_2, \dots, S_n$ is a martingale. Define $(Z_i)_{i=0}^n$ as follows. Let $Z_0 = 0$, and

$$Z_{i+1} = \left\{ \begin{array}{ll}
S_{i+1} & \text{ if } \displaystyle \max_{1 \leq j \leq i} | S_j | < \lambda \\ Z_i & \text{ otherwise}
\end{array}
\right.$$

for all $i$. Then $(Z_i)_{i=0}^n$ is also a martingale.

For any martingale $M_i$ with $M_0 = 0$, we have that

$$\begin{align}
\sum_{i=1}^n \text{E}[ (M_i - M_{i-1})^2] &= \sum_{i=1}^n \text{E}[ M_i^2 - 2 M_i M_{i-1} + M_{i-1}^2 ] \\
&= \sum_{i=1}^n \text{E}\left[ M_i^2 - 2 (M_{i-1} + M_{i} - M_{i-1}) M_{i-1}   + M_{i-1}^2 \right] \\
&= \sum_{i=1}^n \text{E}\left[ M_i^2 - M_{i-1}^2 \right] - 2\text{E}\left[ M_{i-1} (M_{i}-M_{i-1})\right]\\
&= \text{E}[M_n^2] - \text{E}[M_0^2] = \text{E}[M_n^2].
\end{align}$$

Applying this result to the martingale $(S_i)_{i=0}^n$, we have

$$\begin{align}
\text{Pr}\left( \max_{1 \leq i \leq n} |S_i| \geq \lambda\right) &=
\text{Pr}[|Z_n| \geq \lambda] \\
&\leq \frac{1}{\lambda^2} \text{E}[Z_n^2]
=\frac{1}{\lambda^2} \sum_{i=1}^n \text{E}[(Z_i - Z_{i-1})^2] \\
&\leq \frac{1}{\lambda^2} \sum_{i=1}^n \text{E}[(S_i - S_{i-1})^2]
=\frac{1}{\lambda^2} \text{E}[S_n^2] = \frac{1}{\lambda^2} \text{Var}[S_n]
\end{align}$$

where the first inequality follows by Chebyshev's inequality.

This inequality was generalized by Hájek and Rényi in 1955.

== See also ==
- Chebyshev's inequality
- Etemadi's inequality
- Landau–Kolmogorov inequality
- Markov's inequality
- Bernstein inequalities (probability theory)
