= Alexander Gammerman =

British-Soviet computer scientist and statistician

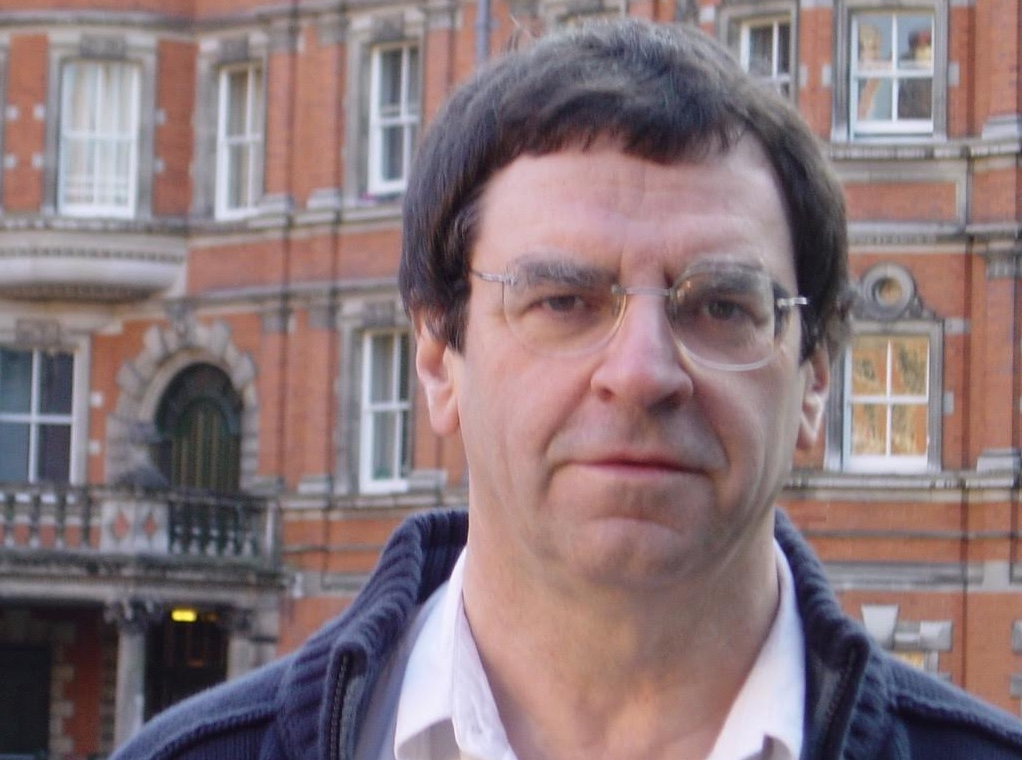
- Born: 2 November 1944 (age 81); Almaty, Soviet Union
- Education: Saint Petersburg State University; Russia
- Known for: Conformal prediction
- Scientific career
- Fields: Machine learning Statistics
- Workplaces: Royal Holloway, University of London

Alexander Gammerman (born 2 November 1944) is a British computer scientist, and professor at Royal Holloway University of London. He is the co-inventor of conformal prediction. He is the founding director of the Centre for Machine Learning at Royal Holloway, University of London, and a Fellow of the Royal Statistical Society.

== Career ==
Gammerman's academic career has been pursued in the Soviet Union and the United Kingdom. He started working as a Research Fellow in the Agrophysical Research Institute, St. Petersburg. In 1983, he emigrated to the United Kingdom and was appointed as a lecturer in the Computer Science Department at Heriot-Watt University, Edinburgh. Together with Roger Thatcher, Gammerman published several articles on Bayesian inference. In 1993, he was appointed to the established chair in Computer Science at University of London tenable at Royal Holloway and Bedford New College, where he served as the Head of Computer Science department from 1995 to 2005. In 1998, the Centre for Reliable Machine Learning was established, and Gammerman became the first director of the centre.

Gammerman has written 7 books.

== Honours and awards ==
In 1996, Gammerman received the P.W. Allen Award from the Forensic Science Society. In 2006, he became an Honorary Professor, at University College London. In 2009, he became a Distinguished Professor at Complutense University of Madrid, Spain. In 2019, he received a research grant funded by the energy company Centrica about predicting the time to the next failure of equipment. In 2020, he received the Amazon Research Award for the project titled Conformal Martingales for Change-Point Detection

== Selected books ==
- Measures of Complexity (2016), Springer, ISBN 3319357786.
- Algorithmic Learning in a Random World (2005), Springer, ISBN 0387001522.
- Causal Models and Intelligent Data Management (1999), Springer, ISBN 978-3-642-58648-4.
- Probabilistic Reasoning and Bayesian Belief Networks (1998), Nelson Thornes Ltd, ISBN 1872474268.
- Computational Learning and Probabilistic Reasoning (1996), Wiley, ISBN 0471962791.
