= History of artificial life =

Humans have considered and tried to create non-biological life for at least 3,000 years. As seen in tales ranging from Pygmalion to Frankenstein, humanity has long been intrigued by the concept of artificial life.

== Pre-computer ==
The earliest examples of artificial life involve sophisticated automata constructed using pneumatics, mechanics, and/or hydraulics. The first automata were conceived during the third and second centuries BC and these were demonstrated by the theorems of Hero of Alexandria, which included sophisticated mechanical and hydraulic solutions. Many of his notable works were included in the book Pneumatics, which was also used for constructing machines until early modern times. In 1490, Leonardo da Vinci also constructed an armored knight, which is considered the first humanoid robot in Western civilization.

Other early famous examples include al-Jazari's humanoid robots. This Arabic inventor once constructed a band of automata, which can be commanded to play different pieces of music. There is also the case of Jacques de Vaucanson's artificial duck exhibited in 1735, which had thousands of moving parts and one of the first to mimic a biological system. The duck could reportedly eat and digest, drink, quack, and splash in a pool. It was exhibited all over Europe until it fell into disrepair.

In the late 1600s, following René Descartes' claims that animals could be understood as purely physical machines, there was increasing interest in the question of whether a machine could be designed that, like an animal, could generate offspring (a self-replicating machine). However, it wasn't until the invention of cheap computing power that artificial life as a legitimate science began in earnest, steeped more in the theoretical and computational than the mechanical and mythological.

== 1950s–1970s ==
One of the earliest thinkers of the modern age to postulate the potentials of artificial life, separate from artificial intelligence, was math and computer prodigy John von Neumann. At the Hixon Symposium, hosted by Linus Pauling in Pasadena, California in the late 1940s, von Neumann delivered a lecture titled "The General and Logical Theory of Automata." He defined an "automaton" as any machine whose behavior proceeded logically from step to step by combining information from the environment and its own programming, and said that natural organisms would in the end be found to follow similar simple rules. He also spoke about the idea of self-replicating machines. He postulated a made-up of a control computer, a construction arm, and a long series of instructions, floating in a lake of parts. By following the instructions that were part of its own body, it could create an identical machine. He followed this idea by creating (with Stanislaw Ulam) a purely logic-based automaton, not requiring a physical body but based on the changing states of the cells in an infinite grid – the first cellular automaton. It was extraordinarily complicated compared to later CAs, having hundreds of thousands of cells which could each exist in one of twenty-nine states, but von Neumann felt he needed the complexity in order for it to function not just as a self-replicating "machine", but also as a universal computer as defined by Alan Turing. This "universal constructor" read from a tape of instructions and wrote out a series of cells that could then be made active to leave a fully functional copy of the original machine and its tape. Von Neumann worked on his automata theory intensively right up to his death, and considered it his most important work.

Homer Jacobson illustrated basic self-replication in the 1950s with a model train set – a seed "organism" consisting of a "head" and "tail" boxcar could use the simple rules of the system to consistently create new "organisms" identical to itself, so long as there was a random pool of new boxcars to draw from. Edward F. Moore proposed "Artificial Living Plants", which would be floating factories which could create copies of themselves. They could be programmed to perform some function (extracting fresh water, harvesting minerals from seawater) for an investment that would be relatively small compared to the huge returns from the exponentially growing numbers of factories. Freeman Dyson also studied the idea, envisioning self-replicating machines sent to explore and exploit other planets and moons, and a NASA group called the Self-Replicating Systems Concept Team performed a 1980 study on the feasibility of a self-building lunar factory.

University of Cambridge professor John Horton Conway invented the most famous cellular automaton in the 1960s. He called it the Game of Life, and publicized it through Martin Gardner's column in Scientific American magazine.

Norwegian-Italian mathematician Nils Aall Barricelli, who worked mainly at US institutions, was a pioneer in computer based simulation of biological processes such as symbiogenesis and evolution.

== 1970s–1980s ==
Philosophy scholar Arthur Burks, who had worked with von Neumann (and indeed, organized his papers after Neumann's death), headed the Logic of Computers Group at the University of Michigan. He brought the overlooked views of 19th century American thinker Charles Sanders Peirce into the modern age. Peirce was a strong believer that all of nature's workings were based on logic (though not always deductive logic). The Michigan group was one of the few groups still interested in alife and CAs in the early 1970s; one of its students, Tommaso Toffoli argued in his PhD thesis that the field was important because its results explain the simple rules that underlay complex effects in nature. Toffoli later provided a key proof that CAs were reversible, just as the true universe is considered to be.

Christopher Langton was an unconventional researcher, with an undistinguished academic career that led him to a job programming DEC mainframes for a hospital. He became enthralled by Conway's Game of Life, and began pursuing the idea that the computer could emulate living creatures. After years of study, he began attempting to actualize Von Neumann's CA and the work of Edgar F. Codd, who had simplified Von Neumann's original twenty-nine state monster to one with only eight states. He succeeded in creating the first self-replicating computer organism in October 1979, using only an Apple II desktop computer. He entered Burks' graduate program at the Logic of Computers Group in 1982, at the age of 33, and helped to found a new discipline.

Langton's official conference announcement of Artificial Life I was the earliest description of a field which had previously barely existed:

Artificial life is the study of artificial systems that exhibit behavior characteristic of natural living systems. It is the quest to explain life in any of its possible manifestations, without restriction to the particular examples that have evolved on earth. This includes biological and chemical experiments, computer simulations, and purely theoretical endeavors. Processes occurring on molecular, social, and evolutionary scales are subject to investigation. The ultimate goal is to extract the logical form of living systems.

Microelectronic technology and genetic engineering will soon give us the capability to create new life forms in silico as well as in vitro. This capacity will present humanity with the most far-reaching technical, theoretical and ethical challenges it has ever confronted. The time seems appropriate for a gathering of those involved in attempts to simulate or synthesize aspects of living systems.

Ed Fredkin founded the Information Mechanics Group at MIT, which united Toffoli, Norman Margolus, and Charles Bennett. This group created a computer especially designed to execute cellular automata, eventually reducing it to the size of a single circuit board. This "cellular automata machine" allowed an explosion of alife research among scientists who could not otherwise afford sophisticated computers.

In 1982, computer scientist named Stephen Wolfram turned his attention to cellular automata. He explored and categorized the types of complexity displayed by one-dimensional CAs, and showed how they applied to natural phenomena such as the patterns of seashells and the nature of plant growth. Norman Packard, who worked with Wolfram at the Institute for Advanced Study, used CAs to simulate the growth of snowflakes, following very basic rules.

Computer animator Craig Reynolds similarly used three simple rules to create recognizable flocking behaviour in a computer program in 1987 to animate groups of boids. With no top-down programming at all, the boids produced lifelike solutions to evading obstacles placed in their path. Computer animation has continued to be a key commercial driver of alife research as the creators of movies attempt to find more realistic and inexpensive ways to animate natural forms such as plant life, animal movement, hair growth, and complicated organic textures.

J. Doyne Farmer was a key figure in tying artificial life research to the emerging field of complex adaptive systems, working at the Center for Nonlinear Studies (a basic research section of Los Alamos National Laboratory), just as its star chaos theorist Mitchell Feigenbaum was leaving. Farmer and Norman Packard chaired a conference in May 1985 called "Evolution, Games, and Learning", which was to presage many of the topics of later alife conferences.

== 2000s ==
On the ecological front, research regarding the evolution of animal cooperative behavior (started by W. D. Hamilton in the 1960s resulting in theories of kin selection, reciprocity, multilevel selection and cultural group selection) was re-introduced via artificial life by Peter Turchin and Mikhail Burtsev in 2006. Previously, game theory has been utilized in similar investigation, however, that approach was deemed to be rather limiting in its amount of possible strategies and debatable set of payoff rules. The alife model designed here, instead, is based upon Conway's Game of Life but with much added complexity (there are over 10^{1000} strategies that can potentially emerge). Most significantly, the interacting agents are characterized by external phenotype markers which allows for recognition amongst in-group members. In effect, it is shown that given the capacity to perceive these markers, agents within the system are then able to evolve new group behaviors under minimalistic assumptions. On top of the already known strategies of the bourgeois-hawk-dove game, here two novel modes of cooperative attack and defense arise from the simulation.

For the setup, this two-dimensional artificial world is divided into cells, each empty or containing a resource bundle. An empty cell can acquire a resource bundle with a certain probability per unit of time and lose it when an agent consumes the resource. Each agent is plainly constructed with a set of receptors, effectors (the components that govern the agents' behavior), and neural net which connect the two. In response to the environment, an agent may rest, eat, reproduce by division, move, turn and attack. All actions expend energy taken from its internal energy storage; once that is depleted, the agent dies. Consumption of resource, as well as other agents after defeating them, yields an increase in the energy storage. Reproduction is modeled as being asexual while the offspring receive half the parental energy. Agents are also equipped with sensory inputs that allow them to detect resources or other members within a parameter in addition to its own level of vitality. As for the phenotype markers, they do not influence behavior but solely function as indicator of 'genetic' similarity. Heredity is achieved by having the relevant information be inherited by the offspring and subjected to a set rate of mutation.

The objective of the investigation is to study how the presence of phenotype markers affects the model's range of evolving cooperative strategies. In addition, as the resource available in this 2D environment is capped, the simulation also serves to determine the effect of environmental carrying capacity on their emergence.

One previously unseen strategy is termed the "raven". These agents leave cells with in-group members, thus avoiding intra-specific competition, and attack out-group members voluntarily. Another strategy, named the 'starling', involves the agent sharing cells with in-group members. Despite individuals having smaller energy storage due to resource partitioning, this strategy permits highly effective defense against large invaders via the advantage in numbers. Ecologically speaking, this resembles the mobbing behavior that characterizes many species of small birds when they collectively defend against the predator.

In conclusion, the research claims that the simulated results have important implications for the evolution of territoriality by showing that within the alife framework it is possible to "model not only how one strategy displaces another, but also the very process by which new strategies emerge from a large quantity of possibilities".

Work is also underway to create cellular models of artificial life. Initial work on building a complete biochemical model of cellular behavior is underway as part of a number of different research projects, namely Blue Gene which seeks to understand the mechanisms behind protein folding.

== See also ==
- Automaton
- Clanking replicator
- Cellular automaton
- Quantum artificial life
- SpudCell
