= Robert Bradbury =

Robert Bradbury may refer to:

- Robert North Bradbury (1886–1949), American film director and screenwriter
- Robert Bradbury Jr. (1907–1988), American film actor, son of Robert North Bradbury, known professionally as Bob Steele (actor)
- Robert J. Bradbury (1956–2011), author of the Matrioshka brain concept
- Robert Elwyn Bradbury (1929–1969), British social anthropologist
