= Computron =

Computron may refer to:

- Computron (Transformers), a fictional character in the Transformers universe
- Computron tube, an electron tube computing device
- Bulova Computron, a digital watch

== See also ==
- Computon, a unit of computing power
- Computronium, a hypothetical substance
