= Selectron =

Selectron may refer to one of the following:

- Selectron (particle), the supersymmetric partner of the electron
- Selectron tube, an early form of digital computer memory
