= Sofic =

Sofic is an adjective coined by mathematician Benjamin Weiss in 1973, based on the Hebrew language word סופי, meaning "finite". It may refer to:

- Sofic subshift, a shift space whose forbidden words form a regular language
- Sofic group, a group whose Cayley graph is an initially subamenable graph

With other meanings, it may also refer to:

- Vedran Sofic, manager of the football club FK Vučijak Majevac
