= Sofic group =

Group whose Cayley graph is an initially subamenable graph

Two balls of radius 2 in the Cayley graph of the dihedral group $D_4$. Both balls contain 7 of the 8 group elements and are isomorphic as edge-colored graphs. Furthermore, for any radius $r$ and $\varepsilon > 0$, we can use the approximating graph $G_0$ as the full Cayley graph itself, where the set $W$ of all vertices satisfies $|W|/|V| = 8/8 = 1 > 1-\varepsilon$. Since all 8 vertices have isomorphic $r$-balls (by the vertex-transitivity of Cayley graphs), $D_4$ is sofic.

In mathematics, a sofic group is a group whose Cayley graph is an initially subamenable graph, or equivalently a subgroup of an ultraproduct of finite-rank symmetric groups such that every two distinct elements of the group have distance 1. They were introduced by Gromov as a common generalization of amenable and residually finite groups. The name "sofic", from Hebrew סופי 'finite', was later applied by Weiss, following his use of the word as a generalization of finiteness in sofic subshifts. A non-sofic group is a group that is not a sofic group.

The class of sofic groups is closed under the operations of taking subgroups, extensions by amenable groups, and free products. A finitely generated group is sofic if it is the limit of a sequence of sofic groups. The limit of a sequence of amenable groups (that is, an initially subamenable group) is necessarily sofic, but there exist sofic groups that are not initially subamenable groups.

Gromov proved that Sofic groups are surjunctive. That is, they obey a form of the Garden of Eden theorem for cellular automata defined over the group (dynamical systems whose states are mappings from the group to a finite set and whose state transitions are translation-invariant and continuous) stating that every injective automaton is surjective and therefore also reversible.

== Existence of non-sofic groups ==
In 2026, artificial intelligence research company OpenAI announced a claimed machine-checkable proof by construction of the existence of a non-sofic countable discrete group. The existence of such groups had been an open question. Researchers in the field have raised the possibility that key ideas in the proof were taken from their unpublished research, about which they had non-public conversation with OpenAI's chatbots. Similar concerns were raised about OpenAI's announcement of a claimed solution to the Navier-Stokes Millennium Prize Problem.
