= Tommaso Toffoli =

Italian-American professor of electrical and computer engineering (born 1943)

- Born: 1943 (age 82–83)
- Education: University of Rome La Sapienza; University of Michigan (PhD)
- Known for: Toffoli gate Computronium
- Scientific career
- Fields: Computer Science

Tommaso Toffoli (Italian pronunciation: [tomˈmaːzo ˈtɔffoli]; born June 1943) is an Italian-American professor of electrical and computer engineering at Boston University where he joined the faculty in 1995. He has worked on cellular automata and the theory of artificial life (with Edward Fredkin and others), and is known for the invention of the Toffoli gate.

== Early life and career ==
Toffoli was born in June 1943 in Montereale Valcellina, in northeastern Italy, to Francesco and Valentina (Saveri) Toffoli, and was raised in Rome, Italy. He received his laurea in physics (equivalent to a master's degree) from the University of Rome La Sapienza in 1967.

Toffoli moved to the United States in 1969.

In 1976 he received a PhD in computer and communication science from the University of Michigan, then in 1978 he joined the faculty of the Massachusetts Institute of Technology as a principal research scientist. In 1995 he joined the faculty of Boston University. As of 2025, he is retired.

== Books ==
- Cellular Automata Machines: A New Environment for Modeling, MIT Press (1987), with Norman Margolus. ISBN 0-262-20060-0.

== See also ==
- Billiard-ball computer
- Block cellular automaton
- CAM-6
- Computronium
- Critters (cellular automaton)
- Programmable matter
- Reversible cellular automaton
