= Cam-6 =

The CAM-6 accelerator is a PC-compatible expansion board designed to simulate cellular automata, presenting the output to an IBM CGA display. It was designed by Tommaso Toffoli and Norman Margolus and is described at length in "Cellular Automata Machines", by Toffoli and Margolus (MIT Press, 1987). The card was engineered and produced by Systems Concepts but production problems made it very hard for interested customers to acquire one.
