= Computon =

Combined unit of computing power

A computon is a combined unit of computing power, including processor cycles, memory, disk storage and bandwidth, proposed in 2005 by researchers at Hewlett-Packard, with the word being a cross between "computation" and "photon", the name for a packet of electromagnetic energy. HP hoped that the computon would become the computing industry's equivalent to public utility's watt-hour.

== See also ==
- Computron
- Grid computing
- Distributed computing
- Computronium
