= Jan A. Rajchman =

Jan Aleksander Rajchman
- Born: August 10, 1911; London, England
- Died: April 1, 1989 (aged 77)
- Known for: Electrostatic photomultiplier Magnetic-core memory Computron tube Selectron tube
- Awards: Louis E. Levy Medal (1948); IRE Morris Liebmann Memorial Prize (1960); IEEE Edison Medal (1974); Harold Pender Award (1977)

Jan Aleksander Rajchman (10 August 1911 – 1 April 1989) was a Polish-American electrical engineer and computer pioneer.

== Biography ==
Jan Aleksander was son of Ludwik Rajchman and Maria Bojańczyk. His father was a Polish bacteriologist and the founder of UNICEF. He was born in London, where his parents temporarily lived, and where his father held various positions at the Royal Institute of Public Health and King's College.

He received the Diploma of Electrical Engineering from the Swiss Federal Institute of Technology in Zurich in 1935, and became a Doctor of Science in 1938.

Rajchman emigrated to America in 1935. He joined RCA Laboratory directed by Vladimir K. Zworykin in January 1936.

He was a prolific inventor with 107 US patents among others logic circuits for arithmetic. He conceived the first read-only memory, which was widely used in early computers. He conceived and developed the selectively addressable storage tube, the ill-fated Selectron tube, and the core memory.

He was a Fellow of the Institute of Electrical and Electronics Engineers (IEEE), and a member of the National Academy of Engineering. He is also a member of Sigma Xi, the Association for Computing Machinery (ACM), the Physical Society, the New York Academy of Sciences, and a Fellow of the American Association for the Advancement of Science and the Franklin Institute. He received the 1960 IEEE Morris N. Liebmann Memorial Award and the 1974 IEEE Edison Medal For a creative career in the development of electronic devices and for pioneering work in computer memory systems.

== US patents ==
- U.S. patent 2,792,563 – Magnetic System, 1957

== Sources ==
- IEEE History Site
- Smithsonian Oral History, Interview with Rajchman
- Memorial Tribute
- Scientist of the Day - Jan Rajchman - Linda Hall Library
