= Programmable matter =

Matter which can change its physical properties in a programmable fashion

Programmable matter is matter which has the ability to change its physical properties (shape, density, moduli, conductivity, optical properties, etc.) in a programmable fashion, based upon user input or autonomous sensing. Programmable matter is thus linked to the concept of a material which inherently has the ability to perform information processing.

== History ==
Programmable matter is a term originally coined in 1991 by Toffoli and Margolus to refer to an ensemble of fine-grained computing elements arranged in space. Their paper describes a computing substrate that is composed of fine-grained compute nodes distributed throughout space which communicate using only nearest neighbor interactions. In this context, programmable matter refers to compute models similar to cellular automata and lattice gas automata. The CAM-8 architecture is an example hardware realization of this model. This function is also known as "digital referenced areas" (DRA) in some forms of self-replicating machine science.

In the early 1990s, there was a significant amount of work in reconfigurable modular robotics with a philosophy similar to programmable matter.

As semiconductor technology, nanotechnology, and self-replicating machine technology have advanced, the use of the term programmable matter has changed to reflect the fact that it is possible to build an ensemble of elements which can be "programmed" to change their physical properties in reality, not just in simulation. Thus, programmable matter has come to mean "any bulk substance which can be programmed to change its physical properties."

In the summer of 1998, in a discussion on artificial atoms and programmable matter, Wil McCarthy and G. Snyder coined the term "quantum wellstone" (or simply "wellstone") to describe this hypothetical but plausible form of programmable matter. McCarthy has used the term in his fiction.

In 2002, Seth Goldstein and Todd Mowry started the claytronics project at Carnegie Mellon University to investigate the underlying hardware and software mechanisms necessary to realize programmable matter.

In 2004, the DARPA Information Science and Technology group (ISAT) examined the potential of programmable matter. This resulted in the 2005–2006 study "Realizing Programmable Matter", which laid out a multi-year program for the research and development of programmable matter.

In 2007, programmable matter was the subject of a DARPA research solicitation and subsequent program.

In 2013, dynamic shape displays were demonstrated by the MIT media lab.

From 2016 to 2022, the ANR has funded several research programs coordinated by Julien Bourgeois and Benoit Piranda at the FEMTO-ST Institute, which is taking the lead in the Claytronics project initiated by Intel and Carnegie Mellon University.

In 2025 as an extension to Programmable Matter, the term Programmable Quantum Matter was coined by a team at Massachusetts Institute of Technology led by Dirk Englund, proposing a scalable architecture to construct large-scale quantum cluster states using solid-state qubits. Programmable Quantum Matter is also being developed using neutral atoms to create a quantum simulator. The connection between a cellular automata based programmable matter and cluster state based quantum computing is deeply connected via graph states and an interesting research direction.

== Approaches ==
A 'simple' programmable matter where the programmable element is external to the material itself. Magnetized non-Newtonian fluid, forming support columns which resist impacts and sudden pressure.

In one school of thought, the programming could be external to the material and might be achieved by the "application of light, voltage, electric or magnetic fields, etc." (McCarthy 2006). For example, a liquid crystal display is a form of programmable matter. A second school of thought is that the individual units of the ensemble can compute and the result of their computation is a change in the ensemble's physical properties. An example of this more ambitious form of programmable matter is claytronics.

There are many proposed implementations of programmable matter. Scale is one key differentiator between different forms of programmable matter. At one end of the spectrum, reconfigurable modular robotics pursues a form of programmable matter where the individual units are in the centimeter size range. At the nanoscale end of the spectrum, there are a tremendous number of different bases for programmable matter, ranging from shape changing molecules to quantum dots. Quantum dots are in fact often referred to as artificial atoms. In the micrometer to sub-millimeter range examples include MEMS-based units, cells created using synthetic biology, and the utility fog concept.

An important sub-group of programmable matter are robotic materials, which combine the structural aspects of a composite with the affordances offered by tight integration of sensors, actuators, computation, and communication, while foregoing reconfiguration by particle motion.

== Examples ==
There are many conceptions of programmable matter, and thus many discrete avenues of research using the name. Below are some specific examples of programmable matter.

=== "Solid-liquid phase-change pumping" ===
Shape-changing and locomotion of solid objects are possible with solid-liquid phase change pumping. This approach allows deforming objects into any intended shape with sub-millimetre resolution and freely changing their topology.

=== "Simple" ===
These include materials that can change their properties based on some input, but do not have the ability to do complex computation by themselves.

==== Complex fluids ====
The physical properties of several complex fluids can be modified by applying a current or voltage, as is the case with liquid crystals.

==== Metamaterials ====
Metamaterials are artificial composites that can be controlled to react in ways that do not occur in nature. One example developed by David Smith and then by John Pendry and David Schuri is of a material that can have its index of refraction tuned so that it can have a different index of refraction at different points in the material. If tuned properly, this could result in an invisibility cloak.

A further example of programmable -mechanical- metamaterial is presented by Bergamini et al. Here, a pass band within the phononic bandgap is introduced, by exploiting variable stiffness of piezoelectric elements linking aluminum stubs to the aluminum plate to create a phononic crystal as in the work of Wu et al. The piezoelectric elements are shunted to ground over synthetic inductors. Around the resonance frequency of the LC circuit formed by the piezoelectric and the inductors, the piezoelectric elements exhibit near zero stiffness, thus effectively disconnecting the stubs from the plate. This is considered an example of programmable mechanical metamaterial.

In 2021, Chen et al. demonstrated a mechanical metamaterial whose unit cells can each store a binary digit analogous to a bit inside a hard disk drive. Similarly, these mechanical unit cells are programmed through the interaction between two electromagnetic coils in the Maxwell configuration, and an embedded magnetorheological elastomer. Different binary states are associated with different stress-strain response of the material.

==== Shape-changing molecules ====
An active area of research is in molecules that can change their shape, as well as other properties, in response to external stimuli. These molecules can be used individually or en masse to form new kinds of materials. For example, J Fraser Stoddart's group at UCLA has been developing molecules that can change their electrical properties.

==== Electropermanent magnets ====
An electropermanent magnet is a type of magnet which consists of both an electromagnet and a dual material permanent magnet, in which the magnetic field produced by the electromagnet is used to change the magnetization of the permanent magnet. The permanent magnet consists of magnetically hard and soft materials, of which only the soft material can have its magnetization changed. When the magnetically soft and hard materials have opposite magnetizations the magnet has no net field, and when they are aligned the magnet displays magnetic behaviour.

They allow creating controllable permanent magnets where the magnetic effect can be maintained without requiring a continuous supply of electrical energy. For these reasons, electropermanent magnets are essential components of the research studies aiming to build programmable magnets that can give rise to self-building structures.

=== Robotics-based approaches ===
==== Self-reconfiguring modular robotics ====
Self-reconfiguring modular robotics (SRCMR) involves a group of basic robot modules working together to dynamically form a wide range of structural configurations and exhibit behaviours suitable for a variety of different tasks, similar to programmable matter. SRCMR allows for machines to perform self-repair in the event of damage to individual modules without compromising the functionality of the whole robot. The robots may also alter their physical shape, thereby providing increased flexibility over robots with fixed morphology. Due to a module's lack of specialization as an individual unit, it may be reused in different robots, thus decreasing the cost and environmental impact associated with manufacturing. SRCMR is a growing field of research.

==== Claytronics ====
Claytronics is an emerging field of engineering concerning reconfigurable nanoscale robots ('claytronic atoms', or catoms) designed to form much larger scale machines or mechanisms. The catoms will be sub-millimeter computers that will eventually have the ability to move around, communicate with other computers, change color, and electrostatically connect to other catoms to form different shapes.

==== Cellular automata ====
Cellular automata are a useful concept to abstract some of the concepts of discrete units interacting to give a desired overall behavior.

=== Quantum wells ===
Quantum wells can hold one or more electrons. Those electrons behave like artificial atoms which, like real atoms, can form covalent bonds, but these are extremely weak. Because of their larger sizes, other properties are also widely different.

=== Synthetic biology ===
A ribosome is a biological machine that utilizes protein dynamics on nanoscales to synthesize proteins.

Synthetic biology is a field that aims to engineer cells with "novel biological functions." Such cells are usually used to create larger systems (e.g., biofilms) which can be "programmed" utilizing synthetic gene networks such as genetic toggle switches, to change their color, shape, etc. Such bioinspired approaches to materials production has been demonstrated, using self-assembling bacterial biofilm materials that can be programmed for specific functions, such as substrate adhesion, nanoparticle templating, and protein immobilization.

== See also ==
- Computronium
- Nanotechnology
- Self-assembly
- Smart material
- Smartdust
- Ubiquitous computing
- Universal Turing machine
- Utility fog
