= Robert J. Bradbury =

American futurist (1956-2011)

- Born: 1956
- Died: 2011 (aged 54–55)
- Occupations: Futurist, computer scientist, technology writer
- Known for: Matrioshka brain concept (1997–1999)

Robert J. Bradbury (1956–2011) was an American futurist, computer scientist, and technology writer best known for originating the idea of the Matrioshka brain, a hypothetical star-powered megastructure composed of nested Dyson-like shells optimized for computation. The concept has since been discussed in scholarly and popular literature on megastructures, astroengineering, and far-future computation.

== Career and ideas ==
Bradbury introduced the Matrioshka brain in late 1997 discussions of “Jupiter brains” and developed it into a detailed manuscript by July 1999. His proposal envisioned a hierarchy of energy-collecting and heat-radiating shells surrounding a star. Each shell would use the waste heat of the inner shell for computation at progressively lower temperatures, approaching the cosmic microwave background at the outermost layers. In Bradbury’s framing, such a system could represent a natural end-point for civilizations seeking maximal computational throughput from stellar energy.

Bradbury’s essay on post-biological futures and large-scale computation appeared in the anthology Year Million: Science at the Far Edge of Knowledge (2008), which brought wider attention to his Matrioshka brain concept through mainstream reviews in the Los Angeles Times, The Wall Street Journal and Nature.

The Matrioshka brain has since been referenced in academic contexts ranging from debates on simulation arguments to studies of artificial intelligence, interstellar probes, and megastructure search strategies, often crediting Bradbury for the original formulation.

== Death ==
Bradbury died in 2011. An obituary by futurist writer George Dvorsky reported that he died suddenly following a hemorrhagic stroke.

== Legacy ==
Bradbury’s Matrioshka brain is widely cited as a canonical megastructure concept in discussions of astronomical engineering and long-term futures, complementing earlier ideas such as the Dyson sphere and Jupiter brain.

== Selected works ==
- Bradbury, Robert J. “Matrioshka Brains.” Working manuscript (first released 21 July 1999).

== See also ==
- Dyson sphere
- Jupiter brain
- Computronium
- Kardashev scale
- Astronomical engineering
