= Matrioshka brain =

Huge computer powered by a star's energy

A matrioshka brain is a hypothetical megastructure of immense computational capacity powered by a Dyson sphere. It was proposed in 1997 by Robert J. Bradbury (1956–2011). It is an example of a class-B stellar engine, employing the entire energy output of a star to drive computer systems. This concept derives its name from the nesting Russian matryoshka dolls. The concept was deployed by Bradbury in the anthology Year Million: Science at the Far Edge of Knowledge.

== Concept ==
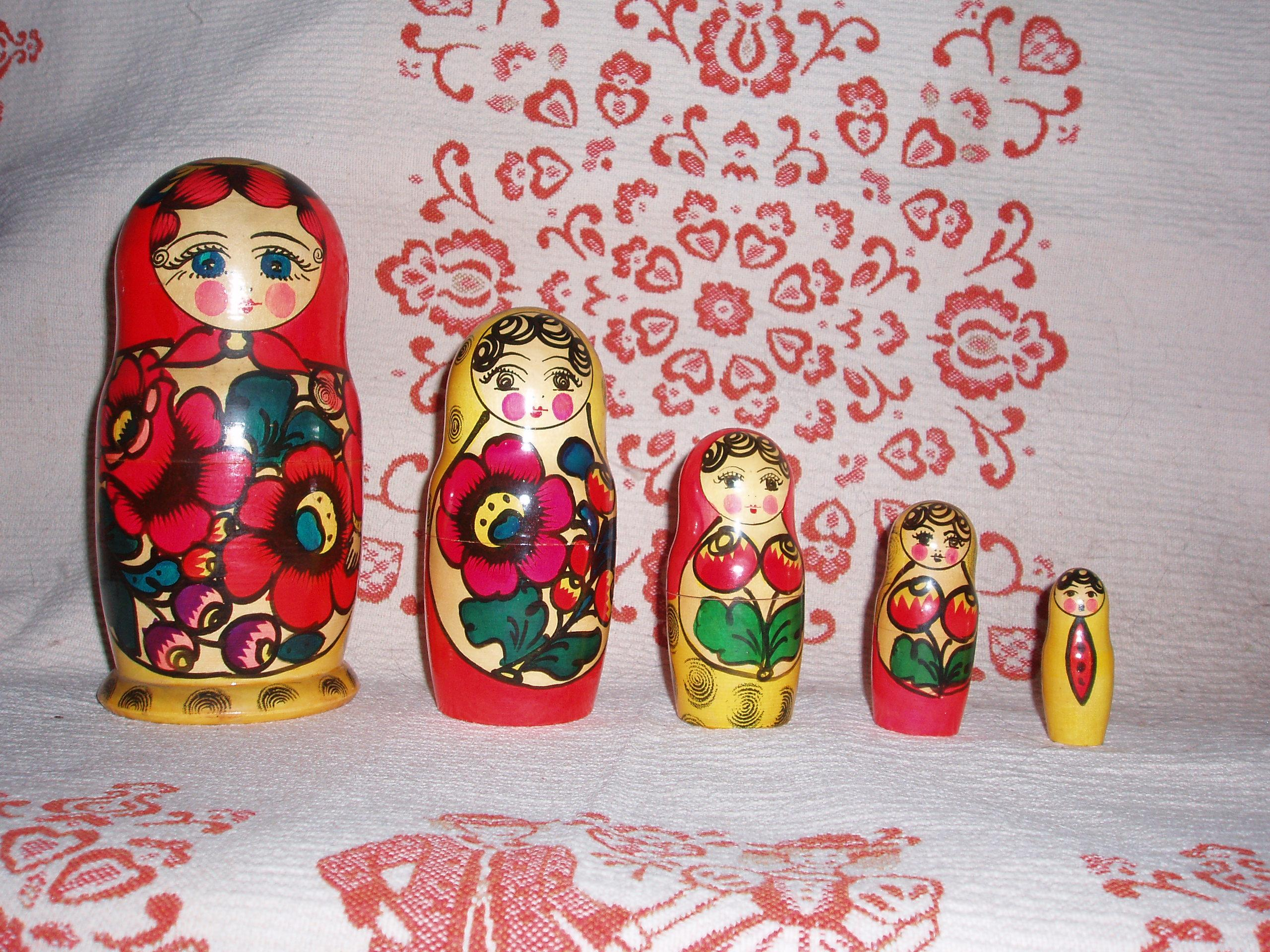
Matryoshka dolls set in a row

The concept of a matrioshka brain comes from the idea of using Dyson spheres to power an enormous, star-sized computer. The term "matrioshka brain" originates from matryoshka dolls, which are wooden Russian nesting dolls. Matrioshka brains are composed of several Dyson spheres nested inside one another, the same way that matryoshka dolls are composed of multiple nested doll components.

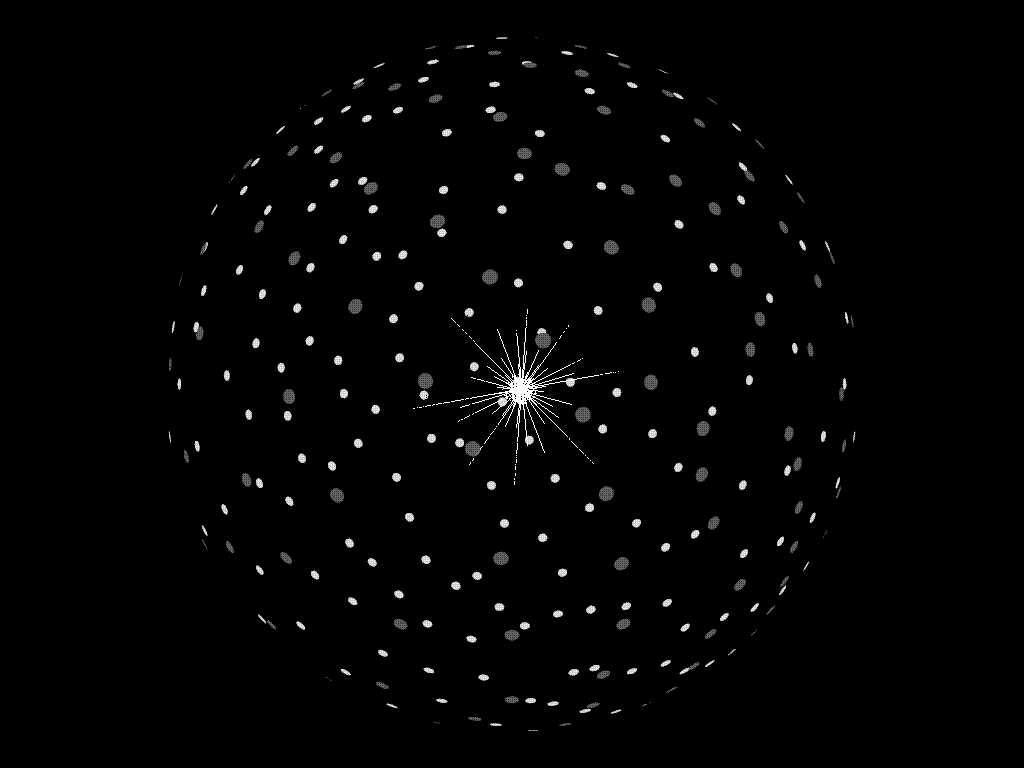
A matrioshka brain would consist of several Dyson spheres (swarms) nested inside each other

The innermost Dyson sphere of the matrioshka brain would draw energy directly from the star it surrounds and give off large amounts of waste heat while computing at a high temperature. The next surrounding Dyson sphere would absorb this waste heat and use it for its computational purposes, all while giving off waste heat of its own. This heat would be absorbed by the next sphere, and so on, with each sphere radiating at a lower temperature than the one before it. For this reason, Matrioshka brains with more nested Dyson spheres would tend to be more efficient, as they would waste less heat energy. The inner shells could run at nearly the same temperature as the star itself, while the outer ones would be close to the temperature of interstellar space. The engineering requirements and resources needed for this would be enormous.

=== Jupiter Brain ===
The term "matrioshka brain" was invented by Robert Bradbury as an alternative to the Jupiter brain—a concept similar to the matrioshka brain, but on a smaller planetary scale and optimized for minimal signal propagation delay. A matrioshka brain design is concentrated on sheer capacity and the maximum amount of energy extracted from its source star, while a Jupiter brain is optimized for computational speed. Jupiter brains are related to the idea of the hypothetical material computronium, which could be enmassed to sizes of entire planets and even stars.

== Possible uses ==
Some possible uses of such an immense computational resource have been proposed.

- An idea suggested by Charles Stross, in his novel Accelerando (2005), would be to use it to run perfect simulations or uploads of human minds into virtual reality spaces supported by the matrioshka brain. Stross even went as far as to suggest that a sufficiently powerful species utilizing enough raw processing power could launch attacks upon, and manipulate, the structure of the universe itself.
- In Godplayers (2005), Damien Broderick surmises that a matrioshka brain would allow simulating entire alternate universes.
- The futurist and transhumanist author Anders Sandberg wrote an essay speculating on implications of computing on the massive scale of machines such as the matrioshka brain, published by the Institute for Ethics and Emerging Technologies.
- Matrioshka brains and other megastructures are a common theme in the fictional Orion's Arm universe, where they are used by superintelligences as processing nodes connected by artificial wormholes.
- The Dennis E. Taylor novels Heaven's River (2021) and Not Till We Are Lost (2024) mention building a Matrioshka brain for use with replicant and artificial intelligence. The large processing power available is also used for security hacking and to run complex simulations in very short time.
- In the Evan Currie novel, A Seed That Was Sown, the beginning of a new series subsequent to his Odyssey One series, makes use of a Matrioshka Brain as a central threat. Currie routinely uses tech at the edge of human knowledge for story components.
- In the Expanse novel series, a crystalline sphere the size of Jupiter was found in a white dwarf system, dubbed the Adro Diamond. It was built by the ancient Ring Builder civilization as a massive computer and data storage archive. Estimated to be five billion years old, the Adro Diamond orbits a white dwarf star called Adro (with its name derived from the star it orbits), and possesses a machine-perfect smooth surface and is composed of densely packed carbon, making it almost transparent. Seemingly abandoned, the species that built the structure has long been extinct.
- In the TV series Pantheon, the protagonist Maddie Kim, an uploaded intelligence, spends 16,807 years constructing a matrioshka brain. Using the DNA and epigenetic memory of every human who ever lived, she simulates billions of parallel universes over roughly 101,000 years, with the goal of creating a perfect ancestor simulation of her pre-upload life in order to functionally resurrect her dead loved ones by extracting their exact copies from it.

== See also ==
- Artificial general intelligence
- Astronomical engineering
- Kardashev scale
- Megascale engineering
- Omega Point
- Technological singularity
