= Ax–Grothendieck theorem =

Injective polynomial functions are bijective

In mathematics, the Ax–Grothendieck theorem is a result about injectivity and surjectivity of polynomials that was proved independently by James Ax and Alexander Grothendieck.

The theorem is often given as this special case: If $P$ is an injective polynomial function from an $n$-dimensional complex vector space to itself then $P$ is bijective. That is, if $P$ always maps distinct arguments to distinct values, then the values of $P$ cover all of $\mathbb{C}^n$.

The full theorem generalizes to regular maps on any algebraic variety over an algebraically closed field.

== Proof via finite fields ==
Grothendieck's proof of the theorem is based on proving the analogous theorem for finite fields and their algebraic closures. That is, for any field $F$ that is itself finite or that is the closure of a finite field, if a polynomial $P$ from $F^n$ to itself is injective then it is bijective.

If $F$ is a finite field, then $F^n$ is finite. In this case the theorem is true for trivial reasons having nothing to do with the representation of the function as a polynomial: any injection of a finite set to itself is a bijection. When $F$ is the algebraic closure of a finite field, the result follows from Hilbert's Nullstellensatz. The Ax–Grothendieck theorem for complex numbers can therefore be proven by showing that a counterexample over $\mathbb{C}$ would translate into a counterexample in some algebraic extension of a finite field.

This method of proof is noteworthy in that it is an example of the idea that finitistic algebraic relations in fields of characteristic 0 translate into algebraic relations over finite fields with large characteristic. Thus, one can use the arithmetic of finite fields to prove a statement about $\mathbb{C}$ even though there is no homomorphism from any finite field to $\mathbb{C}$. The proof thus uses model-theoretic principles such as the compactness theorem to prove an elementary statement about polynomials. The proof for the general case uses a similar method.

== Other proofs ==
There are other proofs of the theorem. Armand Borel gave a proof using topology. The case of $n=1$ and field $\mathbb{C}$ follows since $\mathbb{C}$ is algebraically closed and can also be thought of as a special case of the result that for any analytic function $f$ on $\mathbb{C}$, injectivity of $f$ implies surjectivity of $f$. This is a corollary of Picard's theorem.

== Related results ==
The inverse of $f$ is always also a polynomial function in the case of complex numbers, i.e., $f$ is an isomorphism of varieties. More generally, a bijective morphism $f\colon Y\to X$ of complex varieties is an isomorphism if $X$ is normal, which can be deduced from Zariski's main theorem.

Another example of reducing theorems about morphisms of finite type to finite fields can be found in EGA IV: There, it is proved that a radicial $S$-endomorphism of a scheme $X$ of finite type over $S$ is bijective (10.4.11), and that if $X/S$ is of finite presentation, and the endomorphism is a monomorphism, then it is an automorphism (17.9.6). Therefore, a scheme of finite presentation over a base $S$ is a cohopfian object in the category of $S$-schemes.

The Ax–Grothendieck theorem may also be used to prove the Garden of Eden theorem, a result that like the Ax–Grothendieck theorem relates injectivity with surjectivity but in cellular automata rather than in algebraic fields. Although direct proofs of this theorem are known, the proof via the Ax–Grothendieck theorem extends more broadly, to automata acting on amenable groups.

Some partial converses to the Ax-Grothendieck Theorem:

- A generically surjective polynomial map of $n$-dimensional affine space over a finitely generated extension of $\mathbb{Z}$ or $\mathbb{Z}/p\mathbb{Z}[t]$ is bijective with a polynomial inverse rational over the same ring (and therefore bijective on affine space of the algebraic closure).
- A generically surjective rational map of $n$-dimensional affine space over a Hilbertian field is generically bijective with a rational inverse defined over the same field. ("Hilbertian field" being defined here as a field for which Hilbert's Irreducibility Theorem holds, such as the rational numbers and function fields.)
