= Computron tube =

Type of electron tube

The Computron was an electron tube designed to perform the parallel addition and multiplication of digital numbers. It was conceived by Richard L. Snyder, Jr., Jan A. Rajchman, Paul Rudnick and the digital computer group at the laboratories of the Radio Corporation of America under the direction of Vladimir Zworykin. Development began in 1941 under contract OEM-sr-591 to Division 7 of the National Defense Research Committee of the United States Office of Research and Development.

The numerical function of the Computron was to solve the equation $S=(A*B)+C+D$ where A, B, C, and D are 14 bit inputs and S is a 28 bit output. This function was key to the RCA attempt to produce a non-analog computer based fire-control system for use in artillery aiming during WWII.

A simple way to describe the physically complex Computron is to begin with a cathode ray tube structure in the form of a right-circular cylinder with a central vertical cathode structure. The cylinder is composed of 14 discrete planes, each plane having 14 individual radial outward projecting beams. Each of the 196 individual beams is steered by multiple deflection plates toward its two targets. Some deflection plates are connected to circuitry external to the Computron and are the data inputs. The balance of the plates are connected to internal targets and are the partial sums and products from other stages within the tube. Some of the targets are connected to circuitry outside the tube and represent the result.

The electronic function of the Computron design incorporated steered, rather than gated, multiple electron beams. Additionally, the Computron was based on the ability of a secondary electron emission target, under electron bombardment, to assume the potential of the nearest collector electrode. The Additron Tube design by Josef Kates gated electron beams of a fixed trajectory with several control grids which either passed or blocked a current. The Computron was a complex cathode ray tube while the Additron was a triode with multiple grids and targets.

A subsection of the Computron was prototyped and tested and the concept validated but the building of an entire device was never attempted.

A United States Patent was filed 30 July 1943 and granted 22 July 1947 for the Computron.

== Modern implications ==
The Computron design was an early attempt to produce not only a vacuum tube integrated circuit for both size and reliability (lifetime) issues, but to minimize external electrical connections between active elements. The goal of integration is not merely to reduce external signal connections into and out of a package by including multiple active devices in one package, as in the Loewe 3NF tube. It is to merge the functions of the active devices for a technical synergy. A modern example would be the multiple-emitter transistor of transistor–transistor logic integrated circuits

Another modern construct anticipated by the Computron is the barrel shifter circuit which is used in many numeric computation style microprocessors.

== Damning praise ==
The Computron was an idea born of the necessity of war research. It was to be a key element of the electronic digital computer which had yet to be built. But the project was begun to increase the accuracy of artillery in battle, not to advance the state of the embryonic electronic computer.

Its fate was well described in a letter to Dr. Paul E. Klopsteg, Head of NDRC Division 17, dated 6 February 1943 which concludes:

...As I said above, our entire Division is exceedingly reluctant to see a development which is scientifically so beautiful and so promising dropped at this point, though cold reason tells us that we cannot justify the expenditure of additional Government funds on the basis of Fire Control at this time.

Sincerely yours,
Harold L. Hazen

Chief, Division 7

== Patents ==
- U.S. patent 2,424,289
