= Computronium =

Hypothetical material

Computronium is a material hypothesized by Norman Margolus and Tommaso Toffoli of the Massachusetts Institute of Technology (MIT) in 1991 to be used as "programmable matter", a substrate for computer modeling of virtually any real object.

It also refers to an arrangement of matter that is the best possible form of computing device for that amount of matter. In this context, the term can refer both to a theoretically perfect arrangement of hypothetical materials that would have been developed using nanotechnology at the molecular, atomic, or subatomic level (in which case this interpretation of computronium could be unobtainium), and to the best possible achievable form using currently available and used computational materials.

According to the Barrow scale, a modified variant of the Kardashev scale created by British physicist John D. Barrow, which is intended to categorize the development stage of extraterrestrial civilizations, it would be conceivable that advanced civilizations do not claim more and more space and resources, but optimize their already available space increasingly, for example by building a matrioshka brain consisting of several layers of computronium around their star.

In the 2010 film The Singularity Is Near: A True Story About the Future, American futurist Ray Kurzweil discusses a universe filled with computronium. He believes this could be possible as early as the late 22nd century and would be accomplished by sending intelligent nanobots through the universe faster than light, e.g. by using wormholes. According to him, such an endeavor would have the potential to prevent the natural ending of the universe.

In addition, the term computronium is used in connection with science fiction narratives, including Machine, by Elizabeth Bear; Accelerando by Charles Stross; Revelation Space by Alastair Reynolds; and The Medusa Chronicles by Stephen Baxter and Alastair Reynolds.

== See also ==
- Limits of computation
- Molecular scale electronics
- Molecular electronics
- Computon
