= Edward Fredkin =

American physicist and computer scientist (1934–2023)

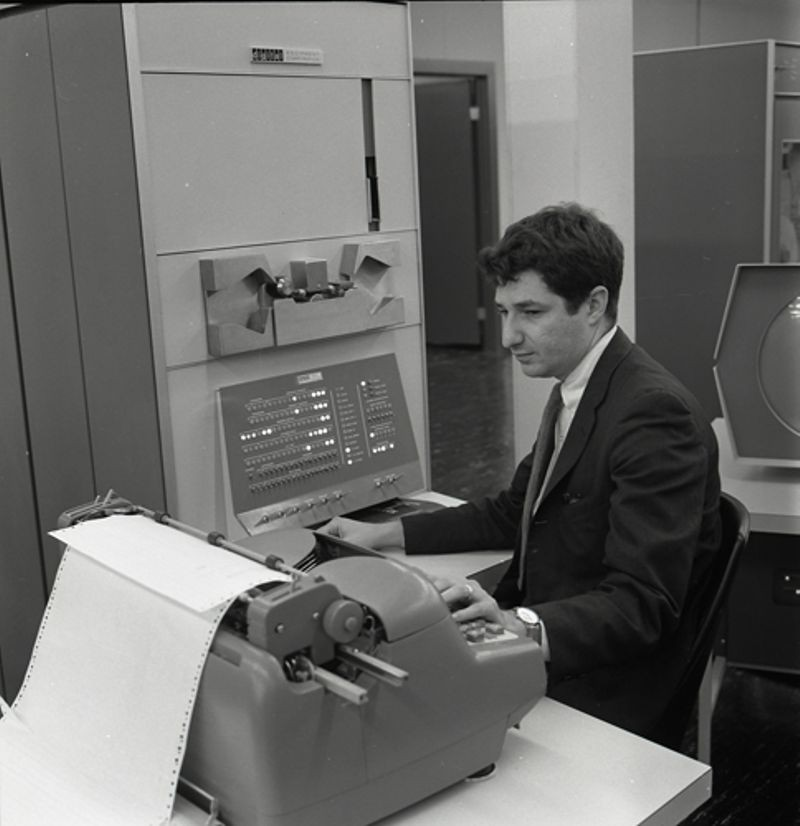
- Fredkin working on PDP-1, c. 1960
- Born: October 2, 1934; Los Angeles, California, U.S.
- Died: June 13, 2023 (aged 88); Brookline, Massachusetts, U.S.
- Education: California Institute of Technology (no degree)
- Known for: Fredkin gate Fredkin's paradox Billiard-ball computer Second-order cellular automaton Trie data structure
- Awards: Dickson Prize in Science 1984
- Scientific career
- Fields: Computer science, physics, business
- Workplaces: Massachusetts Institute of Technology (MIT); Carnegie Mellon University (CMU); Capital Technologies, Inc.

Edward Fredkin (October 2, 1934 – June 13, 2023) was an American computer scientist, physicist and businessman who was an early pioneer of digital physics.

Fredkin's primary contributions included work on reversible computing and cellular automata. While Konrad Zuse's book, Calculating Space (1969), mentioned the importance of reversible computation, the Fredkin gate represented the essential breakthrough. In more recent work, he used the term digital philosophy (DP).

During his career, Fredkin was a professor of computer science at the Massachusetts Institute of Technology, a Fairchild Distinguished Scholar at Caltech, a distinguished career professor at Carnegie Mellon University, and a research professor of physics at Boston University.

== Early life and education ==
Fredkin's mother and father were both Russian-Jewish immigrants who met in Los Angeles, and he was the youngest child of four. His mother was a concert pianist, although she did not perform professionally. She died from cancer when he was 11. His father was a businessman but had lost everything in the 1929 stock market crash and as a result, the family was relatively poor. At times he lived with other families or with his older sister. Eventually, his father remarried, and he and his sister moved back in. As a child, he was both entrepreneurial and interested in science and how things work. He did various weekend and after-school things to earn money, eventually handling a large newspaper delivery route. At age 10 he bought chemistry supplies and made his own fireworks, which were then illegal in Los Angeles. He did poorly in school because he didn't do homework. He graduated from John Marshall High School a semester early so that he could earn money for Caltech tuition and living expenses. Caltech later told him he had been admitted with the worst high school grades they had ever seen. He quit Caltech partway through his sophomore year.

In 1952, he joined the United States Air Force (USAF) to become a fighter pilot to avoid being drafted into the Korean War. His computer career started in 1956 when the Air Force assigned him to MIT Lincoln Laboratory where he worked on the SAGE computer.

== Career ==
Fredkin worked with a number of companies in the computer field and held academic positions at a number of universities. He was a computer programmer, a pilot, an advisor to businesses and governments, and a physicist. His main interests concerned digital computer-like models of basic processes in physics.

Fredkin's initial focus was physics; however, he became involved with computers in 1956 when he was sent by the Air Force, where he had trained as a jet pilot, to the MIT Lincoln Laboratory. On completing his service in 1958, Fredkin was hired by J. C. R. Licklider to work at the research firm, Bolt Beranek & Newman (BBN). After seeing the PDP-1 computer prototype at the Eastern Joint Computer Conference in Boston, in December 1959, Fredkin recommended that BBN purchase the very first PDP-1 to support research projects at BBN. The new hardware was initially delivered with no software whatsoever.

Fredkin wrote a PDP-1 assembler language called FRAP (Free of Rules Assembly Program, also sometimes called Fredkin's Assembly Program), and its first operating system (OS). He organized and founded the Digital Equipment Computer Users' Society (DECUS) in 1961, and participated in its early projects. Working directly with Ben Gurley, the designer of the PDP-1, Fredkin designed significant modifications to the hardware to support time-sharing via the BBN Time-Sharing System. He invented and designed the first modern interrupt system, which Digital called the "Sequence Break". He went on to become a contributor in the field of Artificial Intelligence (AI).

In 1962, he founded Information International, Inc., an early computer technology company which developed high-precision film-to-digital scanners, as well as other leading-edge hardware. The company became publicly traded and Fredkin became a millionaire.

In 1968, Marvin Minsky (who he had met at BBN) recruited Fredkin to work at the Massachusetts Institute of Technology (MIT) as a full professor despite the fact that he had never graduated from college. From 1971 to 1974, Fredkin was the Director of Project MAC at MIT. (Project MAC was renamed the MIT Laboratory for Computer Science in 1976.) He spent a year at Caltech as a Fairchild Distinguished Scholar, teaching Nobel Prize-winning physicist Richard Feynman about computing and learning quantum mechanics from him. Then he was a professor of physics at Boston University for six years.

Fredkin had formal and informal associations with Carnegie Mellon University (CMU) over several decades. His later academic interests were in the area of digital mechanics, which is the study of discrete models of fundamental process in physics. Fredkin had been a Distinguished Career Professor of Computer Science at CMU, and also a visiting scientist at MIT Media Laboratory. As of 2022, he was Distinguished Career Professor of Robotics at CMU.

Fredkin served as the founder or CEO of a diverse set of companies, including Information International, Three Rivers Computer Corporation, New England Television Corporation (owner of Boston's then CBS affiliate WNEV on channel 7), and The Reliable Water Company (manufacturer of advanced sea water desalination plants).

Fredkin was broadly interested in computation, including hardware and software. He invented the trie data structure (independently of René de la Briandais, who published a year earlier) as well as radio transponders for vehicle identification, the concept of computer navigation for automobiles, the Fredkin gate, and the Billiard-Ball Computer Model for reversible computing. He had also been involved in computer vision, chess, and other areas of Artificial Intelligence research.

Fredkin also worked at the intersection of theoretical issues in the physics of computation with computational models of physics. He invented the SALT Cellular Automata family. The name SALT was inspired by the alternating even and odd cells arranged similarly to sodium and chloride ions in a salt crystal lattice. Dan Miller designed and programmed the Busy Boxes implementation of Salt, with assistance from Suresh Kumar Devanathan. The early SALT models are 2+1 dimensional quasi-physical, reversible, universal cellular automata, that are second order in time, and that follow rules that model CPT reversibility.

== Fredkin's version of digital philosophy ==
Digital Philosophy (DP) is one type of digital physics/pancomputationalism, a school of philosophy which claims that all the physical processes of nature are forms of computation or information processing at the most fundamental level of reality. Pancomputationalism is related to several larger schools of philosophy: atomism, determinism, mechanism, monism, naturalism, philosophical realism, reductionism, and scientific empiricism.

Pancomputationalists believe that biology reduces to chemistry which reduces to physics which reduces to the computation of information. Fredkin's career and achievements had much of their motivation in digital philosophy, a particular type of "pancomputationalism" described in Fredkin's papers, including "Introduction to Digital Philosophy", "On the Soul", "Finite Nature", "A New Cosmogony", and "Digital Mechanics".

Fredkin's digital philosophy contains several fundamental ideas:

- Everything in physics and physical reality must have a digital informational representation.
- All changes in physical nature are consequences of digital informational processes.
- Nature is finite and digital.
- The traditional Judaeo-Christian concept of the soul has a counterpart in a static/dynamic soul defined in terms of digital philosophy.

== Later projects ==
=== PDP-1 Restoration Project ===
Fredkin chaired the PDP-1 Restoration Project, which was able to restore and reactivate the Computer History Museum's PDP-1 computer after seven months of work.

== Death ==
Fredkin died in Brookline, Massachusetts, on June 13, 2023, at the age of 88.

== Awards and honors ==
In 1984, Fredkin was awarded the Carnegie Mellon University Dickson Prize in Science, given annually to the person who has been judged to have made the most progress in a scientific field in the United States during that year. In 1999, CMU established the Fredkin professorship.

== Cultural references ==
A profile of Fredkin, along with a readable explanation of some of his theories, can be found in the first part of Three Scientists and Their Gods by Robert Wright (1988). The section of the book covering Fredkin was excerpted in The Atlantic Monthly in April 1988.

According to biographer Robert Wright, the character Stephen Falken in the film WarGames was modeled after Fredkin.

== See also ==
- Fredkin's paradox
