= Von Neumann =

Von Neumann may refer to:

- Klára Dán von Neumann (1911–1963), a Hungarian American mathematician
- John von Neumann (1903–1957), a Hungarian American mathematician
- Von Neumann family
- Von Neumann (surname), a German surname
- Von Neumann (crater), a lunar impact crater

== See also ==
- Von Neumann algebra
- Von Neumann architecture
- Von Neumann conjecture
- Von Neumann entropy
- Von Neumann machine (disambiguation)
- Von Neumann neighborhood
- Von Neumann universe
