= Codd's cellular automaton =

2D cellular automaton devised by Edgar F. Codd in 1968

A simple configuration in Codd's cellular automaton. Signals pass along wire made of cells in state 1 (blue) sheathed by cells in state 2 (red). Two signal trains circulate a loop and are duplicated at a T-junction onto an open-ended section of wire. The first (7-0) causes the sheathed end of the wire to become exposed. The second (6-0) re-sheathes the exposed end, leaving the wire one cell longer than before.

Codd's cellular automaton is a cellular automaton (CA) devised by the British computer scientist Edgar F. Codd in 1968. It was designed to recreate the computation- and construction-universality of von Neumann's CA but with fewer states: 8 instead of 29. Codd showed that it was possible to make a self-reproducing machine in his CA, in a similar way to von Neumann's universal constructor, but never gave a complete implementation.

== History ==
In the 1940s and '50s, John von Neumann posed the following problem:

- What kind of logical organization is sufficient for an automaton to be able to reproduce itself?

He was able to construct a cellular automaton with 29 states, and with it a universal constructor. Codd, building on von Neumann's work, found a simpler machine with eight states. This modified von Neumann's question:

- What kind of logical organization is necessary for an automaton to be able to reproduce itself?

Three years after Codd's work, Edwin Roger Banks showed a 4-state CA in his PhD thesis that was also capable of universal computation and construction, but again did not implement a self-reproducing machine. John Devore, in his 1973 masters thesis, tweaked Codd's rules to greatly reduce the size of Codd's design. A simulation of Devore's design was demonstrated at the third Artificial Life conference in 1992, showing the final steps of construction and activation of the offspring pattern, but full self-replication was not simulated until the 2000s using Golly. Christopher Langton made another tweak to Codd's cellular automaton in 1984 to create Langton's loops, exhibiting self-replication with far fewer cells than that needed for self-reproduction in previous rules, at the cost of removing the ability for universal computation and construction.

=== Comparison of CA rulesets ===
CA	number of states	symmetries	computation- and construction-universal	size of self-reproducing machine
von Neumann	29	none	yes	130,622 cells
Codd	8	rotations	yes	283,126,588 cells
Devore	8	rotations	yes	94,794 cells
Banks IV (Banks IV Cellular Automaton)	2 - 4	rotations and reflections	yes	Somewhere around 100,000,000,000 cells
Langton's loops	8	rotations	no	86 cells

== Specification ==
The construction arm in Codd's CA can be moved into position using the commands listed in the text. Here the arm turns left, then right, then writes a cell before retracting along the same path.

Codd's CA has eight states determined by a von Neumann neighborhood with rotational symmetry.

The table below shows the signal-trains needed to accomplish different tasks. Some of the signal trains need to be separated by two blanks (state 1) on the wire to avoid interference, so the 'extend' signal-train used in the image at the top appears here as '70116011'.

purpose	signal train
extend	70116011
extend_left	4011401150116011
extend_right	5011501140116011
retract	4011501160116011
retract_left	5011601160116011
retract_right	4011601160116011
mark	701160114011501170116011
erase	601170114011501160116011
sense	70117011
cap	40116011
inject_sheath	701150116011
inject_trigger	60117011701160116011

== Universal computer-constructor ==
Codd designed a self-replicating computer in the cellular automaton, based on Wang's W-machine. However, the design was so colossal that it evaded implementation until 2009, when Tim Hutton constructed an explicit configuration. There were some minor errors in Codd's design, so Hutton's implementation differs slightly, in both the configuration and the ruleset.

== See also ==
- Artificial life
- Cellular automaton
- Conway's Game of Life
- Langton's loops
- Von Neumann cellular automaton
- Wireworld
