= BioWall =

Touch display running a cellular automaton

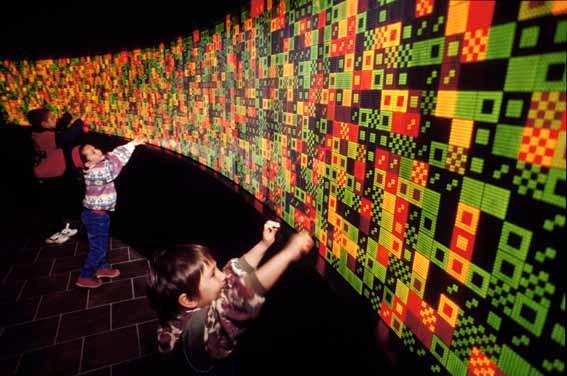
The BioWall

The BioWall is a bio-inspired computing surface made of several thousand electronic modules which can be seen as artificial molecules. Each of these modules contains a programmable electronic circuit, a touch sensor and a display composed of 64 LEDs (Light-emitting diodes). As a result, each module enables the visitor to communicate with the surface by touching it with their finger, calculates its new status and indicates it immediately on a coloured display.

== Overview ==
The BioWall was developed in the Logic Systems Laboratory (LSL) of the Ecole polytechnique fédérale de Lausanne (EPFL), Switzerland. Its construction has been sponsored by Jacqueline Reuge, owner of the Villa Reuge Museum in Sainte-Croix (VD). Two versions of the BioWall have been realized, in which several thousand FPGAs (Spartan XCS10XL of Xilinx) constitute the core of as many modules, locally exchanging information with their nearest neighbours. The interaction with the FPGA is performed through a touch sensitive membrane and each FPGA communicates its state to a 64 coloured LED array.

The main goal of this academic project is the study of the hardware implementation of bio-inspired concepts such as self-repair, evolution, self-replication, learning... following the three main axes defined in the POEtic model:

- Phylogenetic axis (P axis), inspired by the evolution of biological species
- Ontogenetic axis (O axis), inspired by the development and growth of multicellular organisms
- Epigenetic axis (E axis), inspired by the adaptation of individuals to the environment

Among these three research axes, the main effort of the LSL has been focused to the ontogenetic axis through the Embryonics Project, which aims at drawing inspiration from the development of multicellular living organisms in order to obtain in digital hardware some of their original features, and notably growth and fault tolerance.

== BioWatch ==
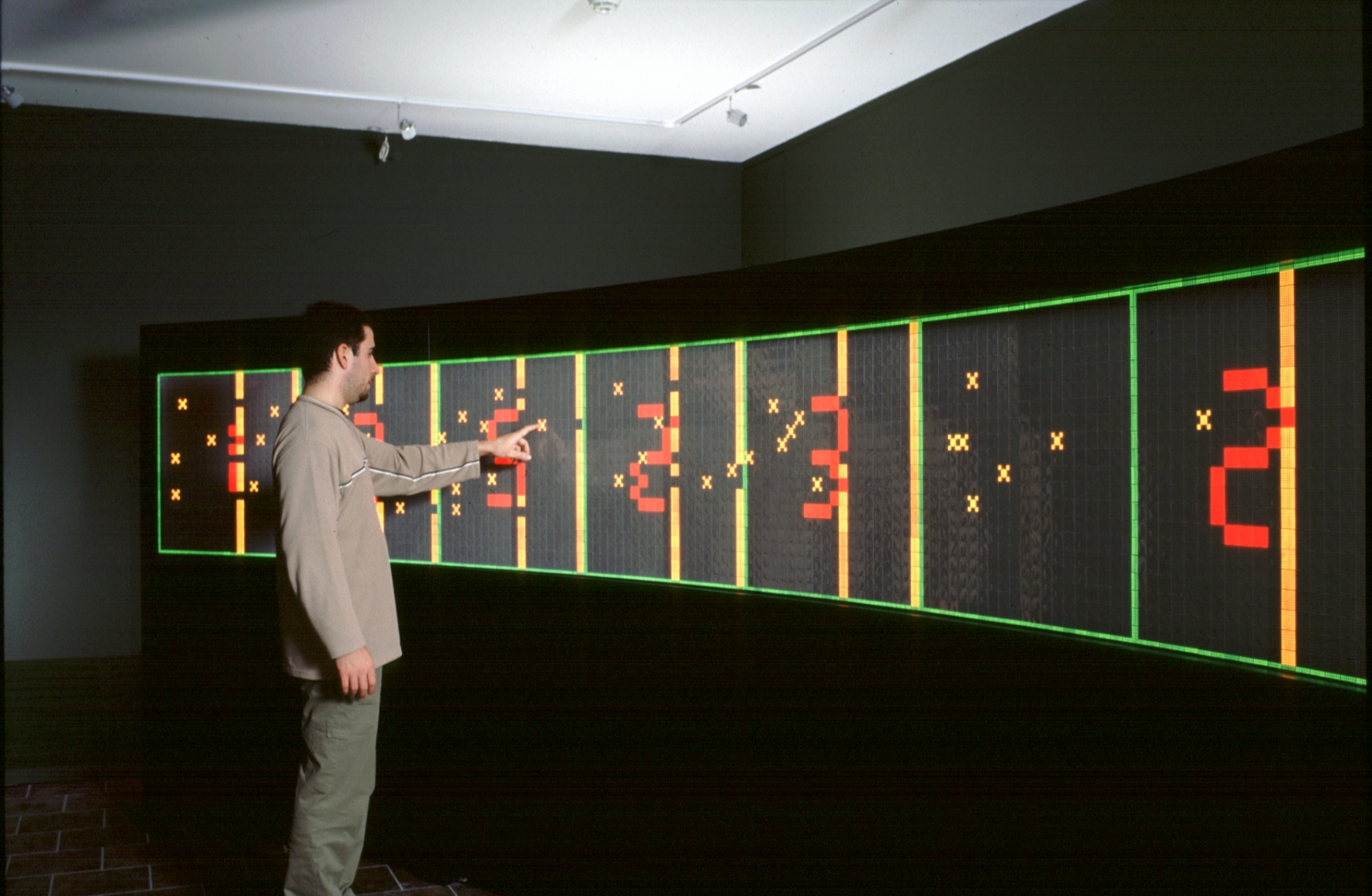
The BioWatch

An artificial organism endowed with all of the features of an embryonic machine was implemented in the BioWall. The BioWatch, which counts hours, minutes, and seconds, is used to demonstrate the growth and self-repair capabilities of the BioWall.

Following the three levels of complexity defined in the Embryonics Project, the BioWatch has been hierarchically designed: The entire watch can be seen as an organism composed of six cells, each of which is dedicated to the calculation of one digit: units and tens of seconds, minutes and hours. Each of these cells is itself decomposed in smaller identical units, i.e. the modules of the BioWall, that could be seen as the basic molecules in a real organism.

Self-repair is possible by including in the BioWatch spare molecules; when a FPGA, i.e. a molecule, becomes faulty, one of the spare molecules can take over its functionality and enables the BioWatch to still display the right time. When a whole cell, counting a specific digit, is overwhelmed by faulty molecules, it dies, but the spare space is automatically configured in order to take over the functionality of the dead cell and to replicate it. As a result, the full watch is then able to tolerate a large amount of faults inside its hardware, and nevertheless can still display the right time.

== Other applications ==
The BioWall is composed of an array of small, locally connected elements and as a result is also an ideal platform to prototype many different kinds of two-dimensional cellular systems and bio-inspired systems, such as:

- Conway's Game of Life (Life)
- Self-replicating Loops (Loops)
- Turing Artificial Neural Networks (Turing)
- Von Neumann's Universal Constructor (UConst)
- Wolfram's Cellular Automata (Wolfram)
- Firing Squad Cellular Automaton (Squad)
- DNA Sequence Comparison (Sequence)

Although the BioWall's size and structure impose a certain number of limitations (e.g. clock speed of the system), its complete programmability provides an outstanding versatility and the visual and interactive component of the system are invaluable tools both for the dissemination of ideas and for the verification of research concepts that are often limited to software simulations.

A BioWall with 2000 molecules is now in the Intelligent Systems Group, Department of Electronics, University of York (England). Another BioWall with 2000 molecules resides in a permanent exhibition in the École Polytechnique Fédérale de Lausanne and can be seen operating live with the following Webcam.

== Bibliography ==
- G. Tempesti and C. Teuscher. "Biology Goes Digital: An array of 5,700 Spartan FPGAs brings the BioWall to 'life'". XCell Journal 47, Fall 2003, pp. 40–45.
- C. Teuscher, D. Mange, A. Stauffer and G. Tempesti. "Bio-Inspired Computing Tissues: Towards Machines that Evolve, Grow and Learn". BioSystems 68(2–3), 2003, pp. 235–244.
- G. Tempesti, D. Mange, A. Stauffer and C. Teuscher. "The BioWall: an Electronic Tissue for Prototyping Bio-Inspired Systems". In A. Stoica, J. Lohn, R. Katz, D. Keymeulen, and R. S. Zebulum, editors. Proceedings of the 2002 NASA/DoD Conference on Evolvable Hardware (EH'2002), pages 221–230, IEEE Computer Society, Los Alamitos, CA.
- A. Stauffer, D. Mange, G. Tempesti, and C. Teuscher. "A Self-Repairing and Self-Healing Electronic Watch: The BioWatch". In Y. Liu, K. Tanaka, M. Iwata, T. Higuchi, and M. Yasunaga, editors. Evolvable Systems: From Biology to Hardware. Proceedings of the 4th International Conference on Evolvable Systems (ICES'2001), October 3–5, 2001, Tokyo. Lecture Notes in Computer Science, Vol. 2210, Springer-Verlag, Berlin, Heidelberg, 2001, pages 112–127.
- A. Stauffer, D. Mange, G. Tempesti, and C. Teuscher. "BioWatch: A Giant Electronic Bio-Inspired Watch". In D. Keymeulen, A. Stoica, J. Lohn, and R. Zebulum, editors. Proceedings of the Third NASA/DoD Workshop on Evolvable Hardware(EH-2001), pages 185–192, IEEE Computer Society, Los Alamitos, CA.
- M. Canella, F. Miglioli, A. Bogliolo, E. Petraglio, E. Sanchez. "Performing DNA Comparison on a Bio-Inspired Tissue of FPGAs". In Proc. 10th Reconfigurable Architectures Workshop (RAW03), Nice, France, April 2003, pag. 7
