= Von Neumann machine =

Von Neumann machine may refer to:

- Von Neumann architecture, a conceptual model of nearly all computer architecture
- IAS machine, a computer designed in the 1940s based on von Neumann's design
- Self-replicating machine, a class of machines that can replicate themselves
  - Universal constructor (disambiguation)
  - Von Neumann probes, hypothetical space probes capable of self-replication
  - Nanorobots, capable of self-replication
- The Von Neumann cellular automaton
