= Luis M. Rocha =

American computer scientist

Luís M. Rocha
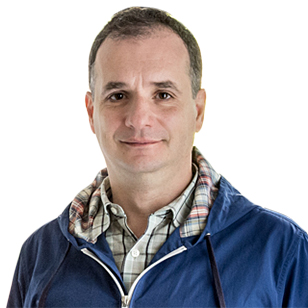
- Born: October 5, 1966 (age 60); Luanda, Angola
- Education: Instituto Superior Técnico, Portugal Lic. (B.A. plus M.S.), 1990; Binghamton University Ph.D., 1997
- Awards: Fulbright Scholar; George J. Klir Professorship; Lois B. DeFleur Academic Achievement
- Scientific career
- Fields: Complex Systems; Complex Networks; Computational Biology; Systems Biology; Digital health; Computer Science; Cybernetics; Systems Science; Biosemiotics; Cognitive Science; Artificial Life
- Workplaces: Binghamton University; Universidade Católica Portuguesa; Instituto Gulbenkian de Ciência; Indiana University
- Thesis: Evidence Sets and Contextual Genetic Algorithms: Exploring Uncertainty, Context, and Embodiment in Cognitive and Biological Systems. SUNY Binghamton. (1997)
- Academic advisors: George Klir; Howard H. Pattee
- Website: casci.binghamton.edu

Luis M. Rocha is the George J. Klir Professor of Systems Science at the Thomas J. Watson College of Engineering and Applied Science, Binghamton University (State University of New York). He is also Visiting Professor at the Católica Biomedical Research Centre, Universidade Católica Portuguesa, where he is the Era Chair of the CBeRa project Strategic Integration of Complex Networks and Systems for Advancing Biomedical Research. Dr. Rocha is a founding partner of the international Center for Excellence in Mental Health Sciences, a Fulbright Scholar, and was director of the NSF-NRT Complex Networks and Systems graduate Program in Informatics at Indiana University, Bloomington, USA, and senior fellow at the Instituto Gulbenkian de Ciência, Portugal. He received the Lois B. DeFleur Prize for Academic Achievement at Binghamton University in 2025, and the Trustees Award for Teaching Excellence in 2006 and 2015 at Indiana University. His research is on complex systems and networks, computational and systems biology, biomedical complexity and digital health, and computational intelligence (including Artificial Life and Embodied Cognition).

== Biography ==
He was born in Luanda, Angola, moving to Lisbon, Portugal in his teens and completing an Licentiate (B.A. plus M.S.) in Mechanical and Systems Engineering at the Instituto Superior Técnico. He received his Ph.D. in Systems Science in 1997 from the Binghamton University. From 1998 to 2004 he was a staff scientist at the Los Alamos National Laboratory, where he founded and led a Complex Systems Modeling Team during 1998-2002, and was part of the Santa Fe Institute research community. He was the director of the NSF-NRT Interdisciplinary Training Program in Complex Networks and Systems, and Professor of Informatics in the Luddy School of Informatics, Computing, and Engineering at Indiana University, where he was a member of the advisory council of the Indiana University Network Science Institute, and core faculty of the Cognitive Science Program. From 2005 to 2015 he was the director of the Computational Biology Collaboratorium and in the Direction of the PhD program in Computational Biology at the Instituto Gulbenkian de Ciencia, where he was a principal investigator between 2002 and 2024. He has organized the Tenth International Conference on the Simulation and Synthesis of Living Systems (Alife X) and the Ninth European Conference on Artificial Life (ECAL 2007).

== Research ==
Dr. Rocha studies the systems properties of natural and artificial systems which enable them to adapt and evolve. He has approached this general topic by investigating how information and redundancy are fundamental for controlling the behavior and evolutionary capabilities of complex systems, as well as abstracting principles from natural systems to produce adaptive information technology.

Accepting Von Neumann's principle of self-replication and Turing's universal computation as a general principle for generating open-ended complexity that encompasses Natural Selection, Dr. Rocha has developed the work of Howard Pattee, Sydney Brenner, and others who regard computation and information as fundamental to understanding life, cognition and other complex systems (a good overview is Gleick's Book). From this viewpoint, he has approached several questions: how do cells and collectives of cells compute? Is language an evolutionary system operating under the same principle? Can artificial systems implement the same principle? Namely, can collective intelligence on the web become a super-organism implementing this principle? From these questions, he has worked on various specific research projects ranging from Biomedical Literature Mining and Social Media Mining to understanding redundancy, robustness, modularity and control in Complex Networks, Collective Intelligence on the Web and in Social Systems, and Agent-based models of Evolutionary Systems such as RNA Editing and Artificial Immune Systems.

== Philosophical views ==
Rocha is a proponent of embodied and situated cognition and has defended the grounded epistemological stance of evolutionary constructivism. He is a proponent of the view that the threshold of complexity required for open-ended evolution requires an interplay between symbolic memory and dynamical machinery, i.e. a strict genotype-phenotype separation. This idea has been labeled semiotic closure and is generally understood to fit in the area of biosemiotics. He has defended that this principle of organization is at play in cognition and human collective behavior, having developed web technology to implement the principle. In addition to scientific work often mentioned in the media, he regularly publishes opinion articles in the popular media to disseminate scientific thinking.
