= Howard H. Pattee =

American biologist (1926–2026)

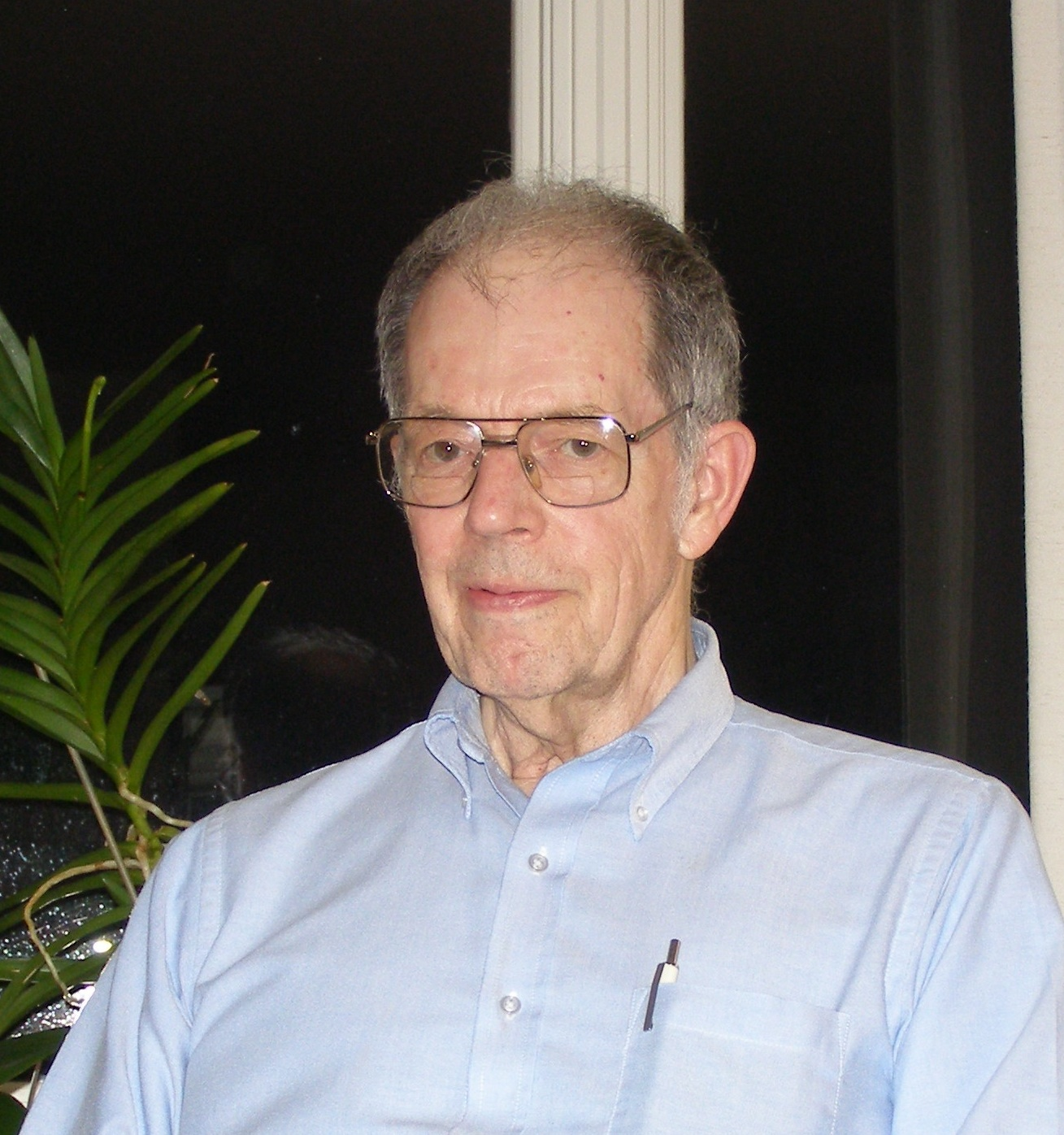
- Born: October 5, 1926; Pasadena, California, U.S.
- Died: July 27, 2026 (aged 99); Williamstown, Massachusetts, U.S.
- Education: BA, Stanford University, 1948; PhD Physics, Stanford University, 1953
- Awards: AAAS (1984); Villa Serbelloni (Rockefeller Foundation) (1969); Sigma Xi (1953)
- Scientific career
- Fields: Theoretical Biology; Origin of life; Complex Systems; Artificial life; Biosemiotics; Biocybernetics; Physics of Codes; Symbol Systems
- Workplaces: Binghamton University
- Thesis: The Compound Reflection X-ray Microscope, Stanford, 1953.
- Doctoral advisor: Paul H. Kirkpatrick
- Doctoral students: Michael Earl Conrad; Luis M. Rocha
- Website: www.binghamton.edu/ssie/people/pattee.html

Howard Hunt Pattee (October 5, 1926 – July 27, 2026) was an American biologist and academic who was a Professor at Binghamton University and Fellow of the American Association for the Advancement of Science. He graduated at Stanford University in 1948 and completed a Ph.D. there in 1953.

== Academics ==
Pattee's main research interests were theoretical biology with a focus on origin of life, artificial life, biosemiotics, semiotic control of dynamic systems, and the physics of codes and symbols. His many contributions to the "symbol-matter" problem within the cell have had much influence on theoretical biology, biosemiotics, complex systems and artificial life. Books by other authors that have built upon his work include The Consciousness Instinct by Michael Gazzaniga and Behavior and Culture in One Dimension: Sequences, Affordances, and the Evolution of Complexity by his former Ph.D. student Dennis P. Waters.

== Death ==
Pattee died on July 27, 2026, at the age of 99.

== Eponymous species ==
- In 2019, a lichen species new to science, Catillaria patteeana, was named for Dr. Pattee.

== Publications ==
- Bibliography
- Downloadable papers
- Howard H. Pattee. Hierarchy theory: the challenge of complex systems. G. Braziller, 1973.
- Howard H. Pattee and Joanna Rączaszek-Leonardi. Laws, Language and Life: Howard Pattee’s classic papers on the physics of symbols with contemporary commentary. Springer, 2012. doi:10.1007/978-94-007-5161-3.
- Howard H. Pattee; Kalevi Kull 2009. A biosemiotic conversation: Between physics and semiotics. Sign Systems Studies 37(1/2): 311–331.
