= Jane Langton =

American novelist

Jane Gillson Langton (December 30, 1922 – December 22, 2018) was an American author of children's literature and mystery novels. She also illustrated her novels.

== Biography ==
Langton was born in Boston, Massachusetts. She studied astronomy at Wellesley College and the University of Michigan, receiving a bachelor's degree in 1944. She received an M.A. in art history from the University of Michigan in 1945, and another M.A. from Radcliffe College in 1948. She studied at the Boston Museum School from 1958 to 1959.

In 1961, Langton wrote and illustrated her first book for children, The Majesty of Grace, a story about a young girl during the Depression who (to quote The New York Times) "cherishes the illusion that she is really the eldest of King George VI's three daughters (and therefore the future Queen of England)".

Langton later wrote a children's series, The Hall Family Chronicles, and the Homer Kelly murder mystery novels. She also created several stand-alone novels and picture books.

Langton's novel The Fledgling is a Newbery Honor book. Her novel Emily Dickinson is Dead was nominated for an Edgar Award and received a Nero Award. The Face on the Wall was an editors' choice selection by The Drood Review of Mystery for 1998.

Langton lived in Lincoln, Massachusetts, near the town of Concord, the setting of many of her novels. Her husband, Bill, died in 1997. Langton has three adult sons: Chris, David and Andy.

In 2018 she was awarded the Edgar Allan Poe Grand Master Award.

Langton died in December 2018, a few days short of her 96th birthday, from complications of a respiratory disease. Her funeral was held at a United Church of Christ.

== Reviews ==
- "Jane Langton is a master blender. She mixes Indian magic, the transcendental philosophies of Emerson and Thoreau, and the plain everyday life of Concord, Mass., and comes up with a splendid fantasy."—Boston Globe
- "Always a witty and literate writer."—Chicago Tribune

== Published works ==
=== The Hall Family Chronicles ===
NB: The model for the Hall Family house is located at 148 Walden Street, Concord, MA.

- The Diamond in the Window (1962)
- The Swing in the Summerhouse (1967)
- The Astonishing Stereoscope (1971)
- The Fledgling (1980)
- The Fragile Flag (1984)
- The Time Bike (2000)
- The Mysterious Circus (2005)
- The Dragon Tree (2008)

=== The Homer Kelly novels ===
- The Transcendental Murder (1964) aka The Minuteman Murder
- Dark Nantucket Noon (1975)
- The Memorial Hall Murder (1978)
- Natural Enemy (1982)
- Emily Dickinson Is Dead (1984)
- Good and Dead (1986)
- Murder at the Gardner (1988)
- The Dante Game (1991)
- God in Concord (1992)
- Divine Inspiration (1993)
- The Shortest Day: Murder at the Revels (1995)
- Dead as a Dodo (1996)
- The Face on the Wall (1998)
- The Thief of Venice (1999)
- Murder at Monticello (2001)
- The Escher Twist (2002)
- The Deserter: Murder at Gettysburg (2003)
- Steeplechase (2005)

=== Other novels ===
- The Majesty of Grace (1961) aka Her Majesty Grace Jones
- The Boyhood of Grace Jones (1972)
- Paper Chains (1977)

=== Picture books ===
- The Hedgehog Boy: A Latvian Folktale (1985)
- Salt: From a Russian Folktale (1992)
- The String of Pearls (1994)
- Saint Francis and the Wolf (2007)
