= Continuous spatial automaton =

Abstract machines which have a continuum of locations with finite states

A continuous spatial automaton is a type of computer model studied in automata theory, a subfield of computer science. It is similar to a cellular automaton, in that it models the evolution of a set of many states over time. Unlike a cellular automaton, which has a discrete grid of states, a continuous spatial automaton has a continuum of locations in one or more dimensions. The state at each location may be chosen from a discrete set of numbers, or from a continuous interval of real numbers. The states may also vary continuously in time, and in this case the state evolves according to a differential equation.

One important example is reaction–diffusion textures, differential equations proposed by Alan Turing to explain how chemical reactions could create the stripes on zebras and spots on leopards. When these are approximated by cellular automata, such cellular automata often yield similar patterns. Another important example is neural fields, which are the continuum limit of neural networks where average firing rates evolve based on integro-differential equations. Such models demonstrate spatiotemporal pattern formation, localized states and travelling waves. They have been used as models for cortical memory states and visual hallucinations.

Bruce MacLennan considers continuous spatial automata as a model of computation, and demonstrated that they can implement Turing-universality.

== See also ==
- Analog computer
- Coupled map lattice
