= Michael Conrad (biologist) =

American theoretical biologist (1941–2000)

- Born: 1941
- Died: 2000 (aged 58–59)
- Scientific career
- Fields: Theoretical biology; Computer science
- Institutions: Wayne State University

Michael Earl Conrad (1941–2000) was an American theoretical biologist. He was a professor of computer science at Wayne State University. His book Adaptability (1983) has been very influential in theoretical biology.

Conrad was the first to publish theory on the evolution of evolvability, beginning in 1972, with the idea that mutations which smoothed the adaptive landscape would increase the chance that other adaptive mutations could be continually produced, and would thereby hitchhike along with those mutations, thus "bootstrapping the adaptive landscape" to produce the "self-facilitation of evolution".

== Career ==
Conrad received his A.B. in Biology at Harvard University in 1964. He entered Stanford University Medical School but was persuaded by faculty there to pursue a Ph.D. in Biophysics with Professor Howard H. Pattee, which he obtained in 1969.

Conrad continued with postdoctoral research at the Center for Theoretical Studies at the University of Miami, and the Department of Mathematics at the University of California at Berkeley working with Hans Bremermann. Not finding theoretical biology positions in the United States, Conrad took an Assistant Professorship at the new Institute for Information Processing at the University of Tubingen in 1973, and a temporary position with the Logic of Computers group in the Department of Computer Science and Communication at the University of Michigan at Ann Arbor.

Conrad finally obtained a tenure-track position in the Computer Science department of Wayne State University in 1979, where he remained for the rest of his career.
