= Christopher Langton =

American computer scientist

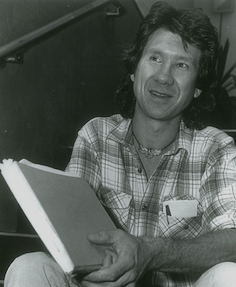
- Chris Langton at SFI, 1989
- Born: 1948/1949
- Education: University of Michigan
- Known for: Artificial life research Langton's loops Langton's ant

Christopher Gale Langton (born 1948/49) is an American computer scientist and one of the founders of the field of artificial life. He coined the term in the late 1980s when he organized the first "Workshop on the Synthesis and Simulation of Living Systems" (otherwise known as Artificial Life I) at Los Alamos National Laboratory in 1987. Following his time at Los Alamos, Langton joined the Santa Fe Institute (SFI), to continue his research on artificial life. He left SFI in the late 1990s, and abandoned his work on artificial life, publishing no research since that time.

He was profiled extensively in chapters 6 and 8 of the book Complexity (1993), by M. Mitchell Waldrop.

== Artificial life ==
Langton made numerous contributions to the field of artificial life, both in terms of simulation and computational models of given problems and to philosophical issues. Early on, he identified the problems of information, computation and reproduction as intrinsically connected with complexity and its basic laws. Inspired by ideas coming from physics, particularly phase transitions, he developed several key concepts and quantitative measures for cellular automata and suggested that critical points separating order from disorder could play a very important role in shaping complex systems, particularly in biology. These ideas were also explored simultaneously, albeit with different approximations, by James P. Crutchfield and Per Bak among others.

While a graduate student at the University of Michigan, Langton created the Langton ant and Langton loop, both simple artificial life simulations, in addition to his lambda parameter, a dimensionless measure of complexity and computation potential in cellular automata, given by a chosen state divided by all the possible states. For a 2-state, 1-r neighborhood, 1D cellular automata the value is close to 0.5. For a 2-state, Moore neighborhood, 2D cellular automata, like Conway's Life, the value is 0.273.

== Personal life ==
Langton is the first-born son of Jane Langton, author of books including the Homer Kelly Mysteries. He has two adult sons: Gabe and Colin.

== Major publications ==
- Christopher G. Langton. "Artificial Life: An Overview". (Editor), MIT Press, 1995.
- Christopher G. Langton. "Artificial Life III: Proceedings of the Third Interdisciplinary Workshop on the Synthesis and Simulation of Living Systems". (Editor), Addison-Wesley, 1993.
- Christopher G. Langton. "Life at the Edge of Chaos". in "Artificial Life II", Addison-Wesley, 1991.
- Christopher G. Langton. "Artificial Life II: Proceedings of the Second Interdisciplinary Workshop on the Synthesis and Simulation of Living Systems". (Editor), Addison-Wesley, 1991.
- Christopher G. Langton. "Computation at the edge of chaos". Physica D, 42, 1990.
- Christopher G. Langton. "Computation at the edge of Chaos: Phase-Transitions and Emergent Computation." Ph.D. Thesis, University of Michigan (1990).
- Christopher G. Langton. "Is There a Sharp Phase Transition for Deterministic Cellular Automata?", with W.K Wootters, Physica D, 45, 1990.
- Christopher G. Langton. "Artificial Life: Proceedings of an Interdisciplinary Workshop on the Synthesis and Simulation of Living Systems". (Editor), Addison-Wesley, 1988.
- Christopher G. Langton. "Studying Artificial Life with Cellular Automata". Physica D, 22, 1986.
- Christopher G. Langton. "Self Reproduction in Cellular Automata". Physica D, 10, 1984.

About Langton's work

- A. GaJardo, A. Moreira, E. Goles. "Complexity of Langton's Ant". Discrete Applied Mathematics, 117, 2002.
- M. Boden. "The Philosophy of Artificial Life". Oxford University Press, 1996.
- Stuart Kauffman. Origins of Order: Self-Organization and Selection in Evolution. Oxford University Press, 1993.
- Melanie Mitchell, Peter T. Hraber, and James P. Crutchfield. Revisiting the edge of chaos: Evolving cellular automata to perform computations. Complex Systems, 7:89–130, 1993.
- Melanie Mitchell, James P. Crutchfield and Peter T. Hraber. Dynamics, Computation, and the "Edge of Chaos": A Re-Examination
- J. P. Crutchfield and K. Young, "Computation at the Onset of Chaos", in Complexity, Entropy and the Physics of Information, W. Zurek, editor, SFI Studies in the Sciences of Complexity, VIII, Addison-Wesley, Reading, Massachusetts (1990) pp. 223–269.

== See also ==
- Artificial life
- Langton's loops
- Langton's ant
- Cellular automata
