= Langton's loops =

Self-reproducing cellular automaton patterns

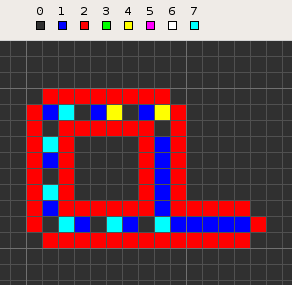
Langton's Loop, in the starting configuration

Langton's loops are a particular "species" of artificial life in a cellular automaton created in 1984 by Christopher Langton. They consist of a loop of cells containing genetic information, which flows continuously around the loop and out along an "arm" (or pseudopod), which will become the daughter loop. The "genes" instruct it to make three left turns, completing the loop, which then disconnects from its parent.

== History ==
In 1952 John von Neumann created the first cellular automaton (CA) with the goal of creating a self-replicating machine. This automaton was necessarily very complex due to its computation- and construction-universality. In 1968 Edgar F. Codd reduced the number of states from 29 in von Neumann's CA to 8 in his. When Christopher Langton did away with the universality condition, he was able to significantly reduce the automaton's complexity. Its self-replicating loops are based on one of the simplest elements in Codd's automaton, the periodic emitter.

== Specification ==
Langton's Loops run in a CA that has 8 states, and uses the von Neumann neighborhood with rotational symmetry. The transition table can be found here: .

As with Codd's CA, Langton's Loops consist of sheathed wires. The signals travel passively along the wires until they reach the open ends, when the command they carry is executed.

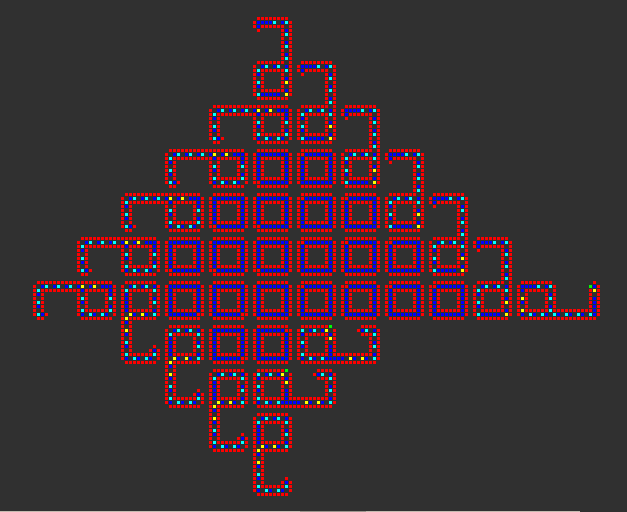
A colony of loops. The ones in the centre are "dead".

=== Colonies ===
Because of a particular property of the loops' "pseudopodia", they are unable to reproduce into the space occupied by another loop. Thus, once a loop is surrounded, it is incapable of reproducing, resulting in a coral-like colony with a thin layer of reproducing organisms surrounding a core of inactive "dead" organisms. The maximum population will be asymptotic to $\textstyle \left \lfloor \frac{A}{121} \right \rfloor$, where A is the total area of the space in cells.

=== Encoding of the genome ===
The loops' genetic code is stored as a series of nonzero-zero state pairs. The standard loop's genome is illustrated in the picture at the top, and may be stated as a series of numbered states starting from the T-junction and running clockwise: 70-70-70-70-70-70-40-40. The '70' command advances the end of the wire by one cell, while the '40-40' sequence causes the left turn. State 3 is used as a temporary marker for several stages.

While the roles of states 0,1,2,3,4 and 7 are similar to Codd's CA, the remaining states 5 and 6 are used instead to mediate the loop replication process. After the loop has completed, state 5 travels counter-clockwise along the sheath of the parent loop to the next corner, causing the next arm to be produced in a different direction. State 6 temporarily joins the genome of the daughter loop and initialises the growing arm at the next corner it reaches.

The genome is used a total of six times: once to extend the pseudopod to the desired location, four times to complete the loop, and again to transfer the genome into the daughter loop. Clearly, this is dependent on the fourfold rotational symmetry of the loop; without it, the loop would be incapable of containing the information required to describe it. The same use of symmetry for genome compression is used in many biological viruses, such as the icosahedral adenovirus.

== Comparison of related CA loops ==
CA	description	number of states	neighborhood	number of cells (typical)	replication period (typical)	thumbnail
Langton's loops (1984)	The original self-reproducing loop.	8	von Neumann	86	151	
Byl's loop (1989)	By removing the inner sheath, Byl reduced the size of the loop.	7	von Neumann	12	25	
Chou-Reggia loop (1993)	A further reduction of the loop by removing all sheaths.	8	von Neumann	5	15	
Tempesti loop (1995)	Tempesti added construction capabilities to his loop, allowing patterns to be written inside the loop after reproduction.	10	Moore	148	304	
Perrier loop (1996)	Perrier added a program stack and an extensible data tape to Langton's loop, allowing it to compute anything computable.	64	von Neumann	158	235	
SDSR loop (1998)	With an extra structure-dissolving state added to Langton's loops, the SDSR loop has a limited lifetime and dissolves at the end of its life cycle. This allows continuous growth and turn-over of generations.	9	von Neumann	86	151	
Evoloop (1999)	An extension of the SDSR loop, Evoloop is capable of interaction with neighboring loops as well as of evolution. Often, the greatest selection pressure in a colony of Evoloops is the competition for space, and natural selection favors the smallest functional loop present. Further studies demonstrated more complexity than originally thought in the Evoloop system.	9	von Neumann	149	363	
Sexyloop (2007)	Sexyloop is a modification of the Evoloop where self-reproducing loops have the capability of sex. With this ability, the loops are capable of transferring genetic material into other loops. This increases diversity in the evolution of new species of loops.	10	von Neumann	149	363	

== See also ==
- Artificial life – Field of study
- Cellular automaton – Discrete model of computation
- Christopher Langton – American computer scientist
- Codd's cellular automaton – 2D cellular automaton devised by Edgar F. Codd in 1968
- Conway's Game of Life – Two-dimensional cellular automaton
- Langton's ant – Two-dimensional Turing machine with emergent behavior
- von Neumann cellular automaton – Cellular automaton used to model universal construction
