= Rulkov map =

Map used to model a biological neuron

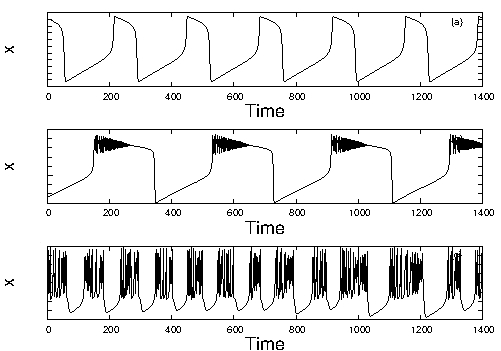
Time series of Rulkov map showing three different dynamical regimes

The Rulkov map is a two-dimensional iterated map used to model a biological neuron. It was proposed by Nikolai F. Rulkov in 2001. The use of this map to study neural networks has computational advantages because the map is easier to iterate than a continuous dynamical system. This saves memory and simplifies the computation of large neural networks.

== The model ==
The Rulkov map, with $n$ as discrete time, can be represented by the following dynamical equations:

$$x_{n+1}=\frac{\alpha}{1+x_n^2}+y_n$$
$$y_{n+1}=y_n-\mu(x_{n}-\sigma)$$

where $x$ represents the membrane potential of the neuron. The variable $y$ in the model is a slow variable due to a very small value of $\mu$ $(0 < \mu << 1)$. Unlike variable $x$, variable $y$ does not have explicit biological meaning, though some analogy to gating variables can be drawn. The parameter $\sigma$ can be thought of as an external dc current given to the neuron and $\alpha$ is a nonlinearity parameter of the map. Different combinations of parameters $\sigma$ and $\alpha$ give rise to different dynamical states of the neuron like resting, tonic spiking and chaotic bursts. The chaotic bursting is enabled above $\alpha > 4$

== Analysis ==
The dynamics of the Rulkov map can be analyzed by analyzing the dynamics of its one dimensional fast submap. Since the variable $y$ evolves very slowly, for moderate amount of time it can be treated as a parameter with constant value in the $x$ variable's evolution equation (which we now call as one dimensional fast submap because as compared to $y$, $x$ is a fast variable). Depending on the value of $y$, this submap can have either one or three fixed points. One of these fixed points is stable, another is unstable and third may change the stability. As $y$ increases, two of these fixed points (stable one and unstable one) merge and disappear by saddle-node bifurcation.

== Coupling ==
Coupling of two neurons has been investigated by Irina Bashkirtseva and Alexander Pisarchik who explored transitions between stationary, periodic, quasiperiodic, and chaotic regimes. They also addresses the additional consequences of random disturbances on this system, leading to noise-induced transitions between periodic and chaotic stochastic oscillations.

== Other applications ==
Adaptations of the Rulkov map have found applications in labor and industrial economics, particularly in the realm of corporate dynamics. The proposed framework leverages synchronization and chaos regularization to account for dynamic transitions among multiple equilibria, incorporate skewness and idiosyncratic elements, and unveil the influence of effort on corporate profitability. The results are substantiated through empirical validation with real-world data. Orlando and Bufalo introduced a deterministic model based on the Rulkov map, effectively modeling volatility fluctuations in corporate yields and spreads, even during distressed periods like COVID-19. Comparing it to the ARIMA-EGARCH model, designed for handling various volatility aspects, both models yield comparable results. Nevertheless, the deterministic nature of the Rulkov map model may provide enhanced explanatory capabilities.

Other applications of the Rulkov map include memristors, financial markets, biological systems, etc.

== See also ==
- Biological neuron model
- Hodgkin–Huxley model
- FitzHugh–Nagumo model
- Chialvo map
