= Universal constructor =

A universal constructor may refer to:

- Universal assembler, a hypothesized nanotechnology device for building a large class of nanomachines including itself
- Von Neumann universal constructor, an abstract device capable of constructing all constructible artifacts of an environment
