= Spatial bifurcation =

Mathematical theory

Spatial bifurcation is a form of bifurcation theory. The classic bifurcation analysis is referred to as an ordinary differential equation system, which is independent on the spatial variables. However, most realistic systems are spatially dependent. In order to understand spatial variable system (partial differential equations), some scientists try to treat with the spatial variable as time and use the AUTO package get a bifurcation results.

The weak nonlinear analysis will not provide substantial insights into the nonlinear problem of pattern selection. To understand the pattern selection mechanism, the method of spatial dynamics is used, which was found to be an effective method exploring the multiplicity of steady state solutions.

== See also ==
- Spatial ecology
- spatial pattern
