= Chialvo map =

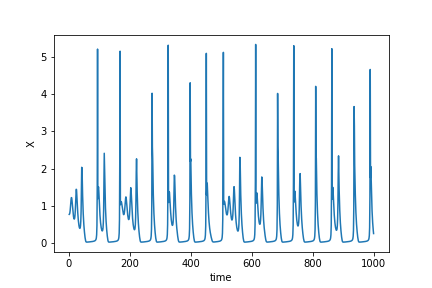
Activation variable as a function of time for the chaotic regime

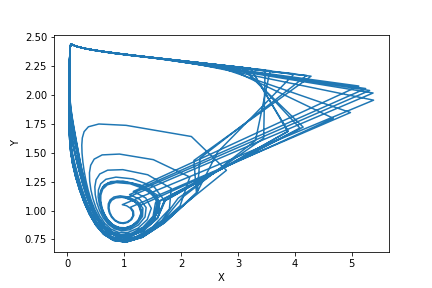
Solution for the Chialvo map equations for the chaotic regime

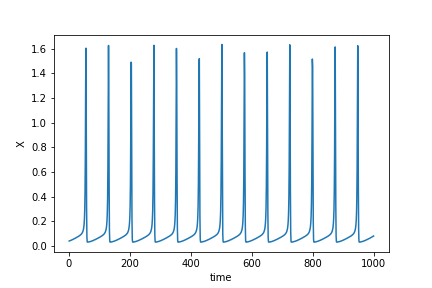
Activation variable as a function of time for the excitable regime

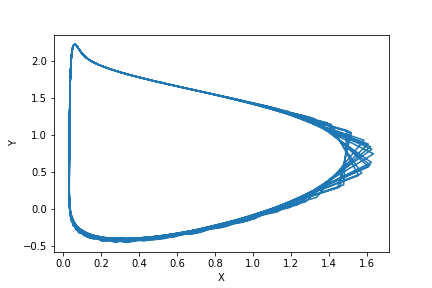
Solution for the Chialvo map equations for the excitable regime

The Chialvo map is a two-dimensional map proposed by Dante R. Chialvo in 1995 to describe the generic dynamics of excitable systems. The model is inspired by Kunihiko Kaneko's coupled map lattice numerical approach which considers time and space as discrete variables but state as a continuous one. Later on Rulkov popularized a similar approach. By using only three parameters the model is able to efficiently mimic generic neuronal dynamics in computational simulations, as single elements or as parts of inter-connected networks.

== The model ==
The model is an iterative map where at each time step, the behavior of one neuron is updated as the following equations:

$$\begin{align} x_{n+1} = & f(x_n,y_n) = x_n^2 \exp{(y_n-x_n)}+k \\ y_{n+1} =& g(x_n,y_n) = ay_n-bx_n+c  \\ \end{align}$$

in which, $x$ is called activation or action potential variable, and $y$ is the recovery variable. The model has four parameters, $k$ is a time-dependent additive perturbation or a constant bias, $a$ is the time constant of recovery $(a<1)$, $b$ is the activation-dependence of the recovery process $(b<1)$ and $c$ is an offset constant. The model has a rich dynamics, presenting from oscillatory to chaotic behavior, as well as non trivial responses to small stochastic fluctuations.

== Analysis ==
=== Bursting and chaos ===
The map is able to capture the aperiodic solutions and the bursting behavior which are remarkable in the context of neural systems. For example, for the values $a=0.89$, $c=0.28$ and $k=0.025$ and changing b from $0.6$ to $0.18$ the system passes from oscillations to aperiodic bursting solutions.

=== Fixed points ===
Considering the case where $k=0$ and $b<<a$ the model mimics the lack of 'voltage-dependence inactivation' for real neurons and the evolution of the recovery variable is fixed at $y_{f0}$. Therefore, the dynamics of the activation variable is basically described by the iteration of the following equations

$$\begin{align} x_{n+1} = &  f(x_n,y_{f0})  =  x^2_n exp (r - x_n)
\\ r = & y_{f0} = c/(1-a) \\ \end{align}$$

in which $f(x_n,y_{f0})$ as a function of $r$ has a period-doubling bifurcation structure.

== Examples ==
=== Example 1 ===
A practical implementation is the combination of $N$ neurons over a lattice, for that, it can be defined $0>d<1$ as a coupling constant for combining the neurons. For neurons in a single row, we can define the evolution of action potential on time by the diffusion of the local temperature $x$ in:

$x_{n+1}^i = (1-d)f(x_n^i) + (d/2)[f(x_n^{i+1}) + f(x_n^{i-1})]$

where $n$ is the time step and $i$ is the index of each neuron. For the values $a=0.89$, $b=0.6$, $c=0.28$ and $k=0.02$, in absence of perturbations they are at the resting state. If we introduce a stimulus over cell 1, it induces two propagated waves circulating in opposite directions that eventually collapse and die in the middle of the ring.

=== Example 2 ===
Analogous to the previous example, it's possible create a set of coupling neurons over a 2-D lattice, in this case the evolution of action potentials is given by:

$x_{n+1}^{i,j} = (1-d)f(x_n^{i,j}) + (d/4)[f(x_n^{i+1,j}) + f(x_n^{i-1,j})+f(x_n^{i,j+1}) + f(x_n^{i,j-1})]$

where $i$, $j$, represent the index of each neuron in a square lattice of size $I$, $J$. With this example spiral waves can be represented for specific values of parameters. In order to visualize the spirals, we set the initial condition in a specific configuration $x^{ij}=i*0.0033$ and the recovery as $y^{ij}=y_f-(j * 0.0066)$.

Example of spiral waves for the Two-dimensional Chialvo map in 100 x 100 lattice and parameters a=0.89, b=0.6, c= 0.26, and k=0.02.

The map can also present chaotic dynamics for certain parameter values. In the following figure we show the chaotic behavior of the variable $x$ on a square network of $500\times500$ for the parameters $a=0.89$, $b=0.18$, $c=0.28$ and $k=0.026$.

Evolution of Potential X as a function of time in a 500x500 lattice for a chaotic regime with parameters a=0.89, b=0.18, c= 0.28, and k=0.026.

The map can be used to simulated a nonquenched disordered lattice (as in Ref), where each map connects with four nearest neighbors on a square lattice, and in addition each map has a probability $p$ of connecting to another one randomly chosen, multiple coexisting circular excitation waves will emerge at the beginning of the simulation until spirals takes over.

Example of spiral waves for the Two-dimensional Chialvo map in an annealed random network starting from a 128 x 128 lattice with probability of rewiring $p=0.25$ and parameters a=0.89, b=0.6, c= 0.26, and k=0.02.

== Chaotic and periodic behavior for a neuron ==
For a neuron, in the limit of $b=0$, the map becomes 1D, since $y$ converges to a constant. If the parameter $b$ is scanned in a range, different orbits will be seen, some periodic, others chaotic, that appear between two fixed points, one at $x=1$ ; $y=1$ and the other close to the value of $k$ (which would be the regime excitable).

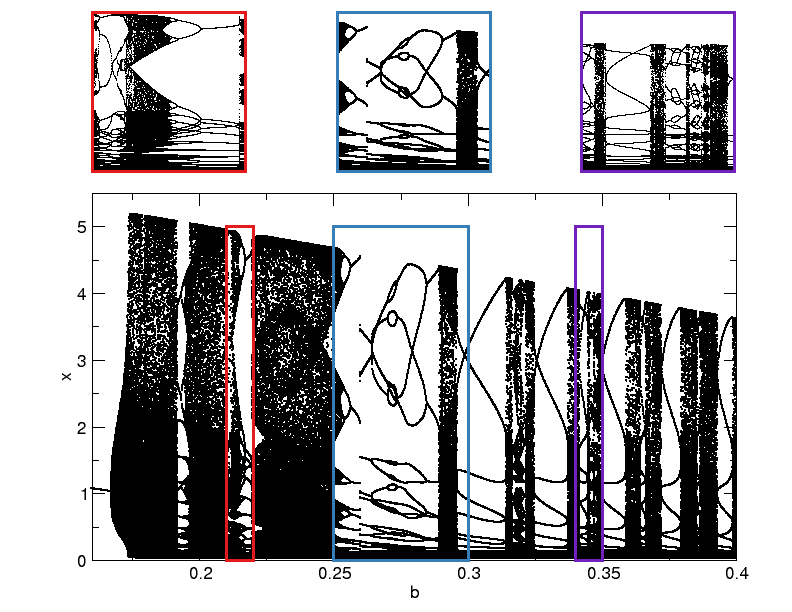
Evolution of $x$ as a function of parameter $b$ for a Chialvo map neuron. Parameters: $a=0.89$, $c=0.28$, $k=0.026$, and $b$ from $0.16$ to $0.4$.

GIF: Evolution of $x$ as a function of parameter $b$ for a Chialvo map neuron. Parameters: $a=0.89$, $c=0.28$, $k=0.026$, and $b$ from $0.16$ to $0.4$.
