= Cellular automaton =

Discrete model of computation

Gosper's Glider Gun creating "gliders" in the cellular automaton Conway's Game of Life

A cellular automaton (pl. cellular automata, abbrev. CA) is a discrete model of computation studied in automata theory. Cellular automata are also called cellular spaces, tessellation automata, homogeneous structures, cellular structures, tessellation structures, and iterative arrays. Cellular automata have found application in various areas, including physics, theoretical biology, and microstructure modeling.

A cellular automaton consists of a regular grid of cells, each in one of a finite number of states, such as on and off (in contrast to a coupled map lattice). The grid can be in any finite number of dimensions. For each cell, a set of cells called its neighborhood is defined relative to the specified cell. An initial state (time t = 0) is selected by assigning a state for each cell. A new generation is created (advancing t by 1), according to some fixed rule (generally, a mathematical function) that determines the new state of each cell in terms of the current state of the cell and the states of the cells in its neighborhood. Typically, the rule for updating the state of cells is the same for each cell and does not change over time, and is applied to the whole grid simultaneously, though exceptions are known, such as the stochastic cellular automaton and asynchronous cellular automaton.

The concept was originally conceived in the 1940s by Stanislaw Ulam and John von Neumann while they were contemporaries at Los Alamos National Laboratory. While studied by some throughout the 1950s and 1960s, it was not until the 1970s and Conway's Game of Life, a two-dimensional cellular automaton, that interest in the subject expanded beyond academia. In the 1980s, Stephen Wolfram engaged in a systematic study of one-dimensional cellular automata, or what he calls elementary cellular automata; his research assistant Matthew Cook showed that one of these rules is Turing-complete.

The primary classifications of cellular automata, as outlined by Wolfram, are numbered one to four. They are, in order, automata in which patterns generally stabilize into homogeneity, automata in which patterns evolve into mostly stable or oscillating structures, automata in which patterns evolve in a seemingly chaotic fashion, and automata in which patterns become extremely complex and may last for a long time, with stable local structures. This last class is thought to be computationally universal, or capable of simulating a Turing machine. Special types of cellular automata are reversible, where only a single configuration leads directly to a subsequent one, and totalistic, in which the future value of individual cells only depends on the total value of a group of neighboring cells. Cellular automata can simulate a variety of real-world systems, including biological and chemical ones.

== Overview ==
The red cells are the Moore neighborhood for the blue cell.

The red cells are the von Neumann neighborhood for the blue cell. The range-2 "cross neighborhood" includes the pink cells as well.

One way to simulate a two-dimensional cellular automaton is with an infinite sheet of graph paper along with a set of rules for the cells to follow. Each square is called a "cell" and each cell has two possible states, black or white. The neighborhood of a cell is the nearby, usually adjacent, cells. The two most common types of neighborhoods are the von Neumann neighborhood and the Moore neighborhood. The former, named after the founding cellular automaton theorist, consists of the four orthogonally adjacent cells. The latter includes the von Neumann neighborhood as well as the four diagonally adjacent cells. For such a cell and its Moore neighborhood, there are 512 (= 2^{9}) possible patterns. For each of the 512 possible patterns, the rule table would state whether the center cell will be black or white on the next time interval. Conway's Game of Life is a popular version of this model. Another common neighborhood type is the extended von Neumann neighborhood, which includes the two closest cells in each orthogonal direction, for a total of eight. The general equation for the total number of automata possible is k^{k^{s}}, where k is the number of possible states for a cell, and s is the number of neighboring cells (including the cell to be calculated itself) used to determine the cell's next state. Thus, in the two-dimensional system with a Moore neighborhood, the total number of automata possible would be 2^{2^{9}}, or 1.34×10^{154}.

It is usually assumed that every cell in the universe starts in the same state, except for a finite number of cells in other states; the assignment of state values is called a configuration. More generally, it is sometimes assumed that the universe starts out covered with a periodic pattern, and only a finite number of cells violate that pattern. The latter assumption is common in one-dimensional cellular automata.

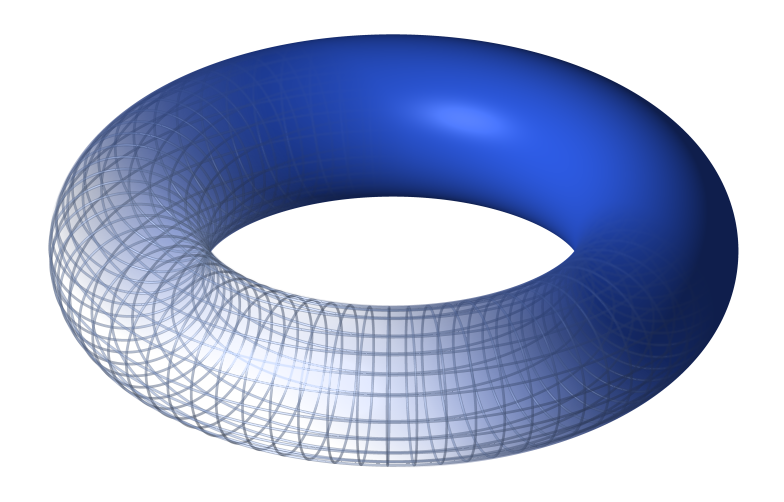
A toroidal shape (the torus)

Cellular automata are often simulated on a finite grid rather than an infinite one. In two dimensions, the universe would be a rectangle instead of an infinite plane. The obvious problem with finite grids is how to handle the cells on the edges. How they are handled will affect the values of all the cells in the grid. One possible method is to allow the values in those cells to remain constant. Another method is to define neighborhoods differently for these cells. One could say that they have fewer neighbors, but then one would also have to define new rules for the cells located on the edges. These cells are usually handled with periodic boundary conditions resulting in a toroidal arrangement: when one goes off the top, one comes in at the corresponding position on the bottom, and when one goes off the left, one comes in on the right. (This essentially simulates an infinite periodic tiling, and in the field of partial differential equations is sometimes referred to as periodic boundary conditions.) This can be visualized as taping the left and right edges of the rectangle to form a tube, then taping the top and bottom edges of the tube to form a torus (doughnut shape). Universes of other dimensions are handled similarly. This solves boundary problems with neighborhoods, but another advantage is that it is easily programmable using modular arithmetic functions. For example, in a 1-dimensional cellular automaton like the examples below, the neighborhood of a cell x_{i}^{t} is {x_{i−1}^{t−1}, x_{i}^{t−1}, x_{i+1}^{t−1}}, where t is the time step (vertical), and i is the index (horizontal) in one generation.

== History ==
Stanisław Ulam, while working at the Los Alamos National Laboratory in the 1940s, studied the growth of crystals, using a simple lattice network as his model. At the same time, John von Neumann — Ulam's colleague at Los Alamos — was working on the problem of self-replicating systems. Von Neumann's initial design was founded upon the notion of one robot building another robot. This design is known as the kinematic model. As he developed this design, von Neumann came to realize the great difficulty of building a self-replicating robot, and of the great cost in providing the robot with a "sea of parts" from which to build its replicant. Neumann wrote a paper entitled "The general and logical theory of automata" for the Hixon Symposium in 1948. Ulam was the one who suggested using a discrete system for creating a reductionist model of self-replication. Nils Aall Barricelli performed many of the earliest explorations of these models of artificial life.

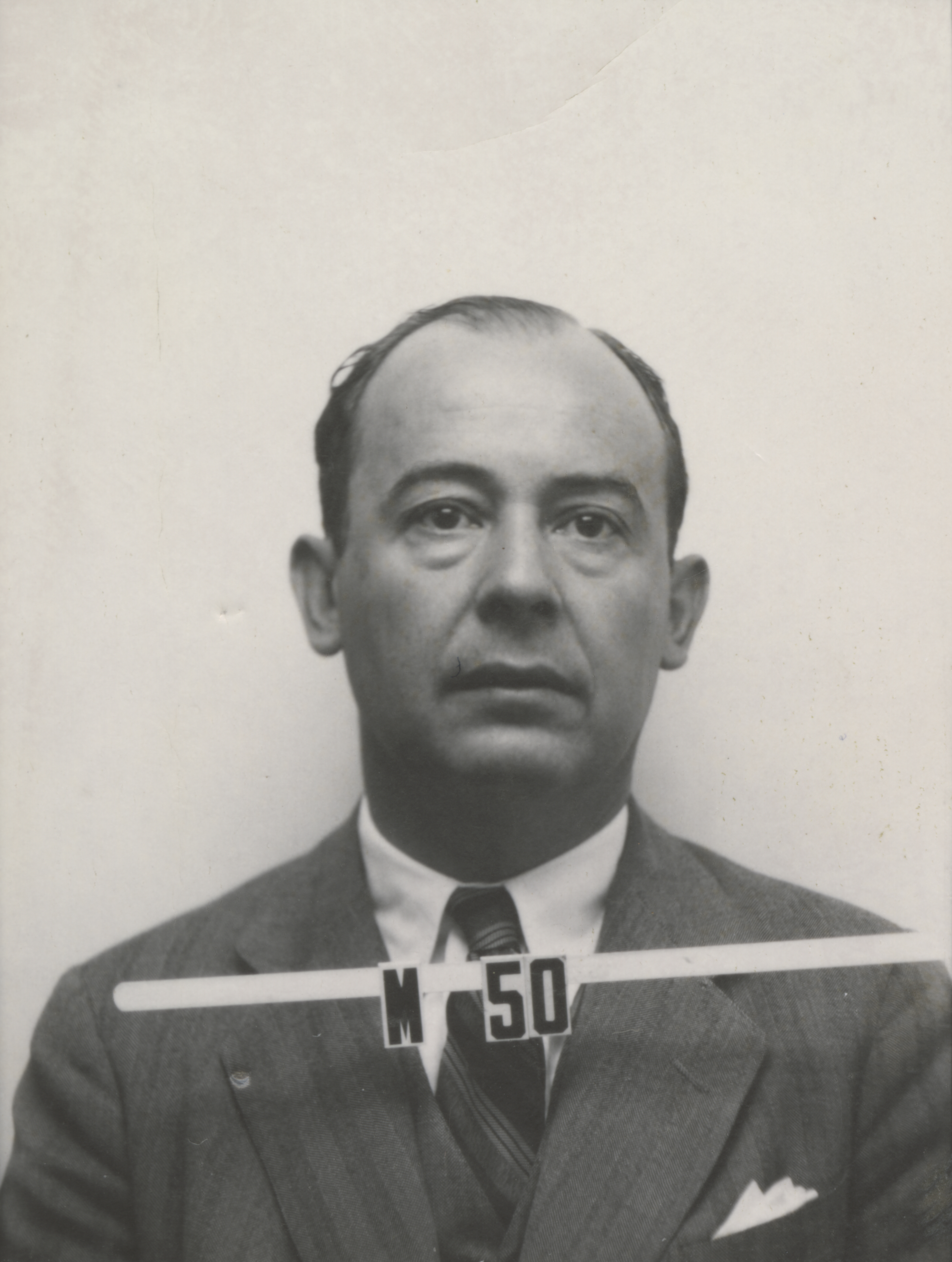
John von Neumann, Los Alamos ID badge

Ulam and von Neumann created a method for calculating liquid motion in the late 1950s. The driving concept of the method was to consider a liquid as a group of discrete units and calculate the motion of each based on its neighbors' behaviors. Thus was born the first system of cellular automata. Like Ulam's lattice network, von Neumann's cellular automata are two-dimensional, with his self-replicator implemented algorithmically. The result was a universal copier and constructor working within a cellular automaton with a small neighborhood (only those cells that touch are neighbors; for von Neumann's cellular automata, only orthogonal cells), and with 29 states per cell. Von Neumann gave an existence proof that a particular pattern would make endless copies of itself within the given cellular universe by designing a 200,000 cell configuration that could do so. This design is known as the tessellation model, and is called a von Neumann universal constructor.

Also in the 1940s, Norbert Wiener and Arturo Rosenblueth developed a model of excitable media with some of the characteristics of a cellular automaton. Their specific motivation was the mathematical description of impulse conduction in cardiac systems. However their model is not a cellular automaton because the medium in which signals propagate is continuous, and wave fronts are curves. A true cellular automaton model of excitable media was developed and studied by J. M. Greenberg and S. P. Hastings in 1978; see Greenberg-Hastings cellular automaton. The original work of Wiener and Rosenblueth contains many insights and continues to be cited in modern research publications on cardiac arrhythmia and excitable systems.

In the 1960s, cellular automata were studied as a particular type of dynamical system and the connection with the mathematical field of symbolic dynamics was established for the first time. In 1969, Gustav A. Hedlund compiled many results following this point of view in what is still considered as a seminal paper for the mathematical study of cellular automata. The most fundamental result is the characterization in the Curtis–Hedlund–Lyndon theorem of the set of global rules of cellular automata as the set of continuous endomorphisms of shift spaces.

In 1969, German computer pioneer Konrad Zuse published his book Calculating Space, proposing that the physical laws of the universe are discrete by nature, and that the entire universe is the output of a deterministic computation on a single cellular automaton; "Zuse's Theory" became the foundation of the field of study called digital physics.

Also in 1969 computer scientist Alvy Ray Smith completed a Stanford PhD dissertation on Cellular Automata Theory, the first mathematical treatment of CA as a general class of computers. Many papers came from this dissertation: He showed the equivalence of neighborhoods of various shapes, how to reduce a Moore to a von Neumann neighborhood or how to reduce any neighborhood to a von Neumann neighborhood. He proved that two-dimensional CA are computation universal, introduced 1-dimensional CA, and showed that they too are computation universal, even with simple neighborhoods. He showed how to subsume the complex von Neumann proof of construction universality (and hence self-reproducing machines) into a consequence of computation universality in a 1-dimensional CA. Intended as the introduction to the German edition of von Neumann's book on CA, he wrote a survey of the field with dozens of references to papers, by many authors in many countries over a decade or so of work, often overlooked by modern CA researchers.

In the 1970s a two-state, two-dimensional cellular automaton named Game of Life became widely known, particularly among the early computing community. Invented by John Conway and popularized by Martin Gardner in a Scientific American article, its rules are as follows:

1. Any live cell with fewer than two live neighbours dies, as if caused by underpopulation.
2. Any live cell with two or three live neighbours lives on to the next generation.
3. Any live cell with more than three live neighbours dies, as if by overpopulation.
4. Any dead cell with exactly three live neighbours becomes a live cell, as if by reproduction.

Despite its simplicity, the system achieves an impressive diversity of behavior, fluctuating between apparent randomness and order. One of the most apparent features of the Game of Life is the frequent occurrence of gliders, arrangements of cells that essentially move themselves across the grid. It is possible to arrange the automaton so that the gliders interact to perform computations, and after much effort it has been shown that the Game of Life can emulate a universal Turing machine. It was viewed as a largely recreational topic, and little follow-up work was done outside of investigating the particularities of the Game of Life and a few related rules in the early 1970s.

Stephen Wolfram independently began working on cellular automata in mid-1981 after considering how complex patterns seemed formed in nature in violation of the second law of thermodynamics. His investigations were initially spurred by a desire to model systems such as the neural networks found in brains. He published his first paper in Reviews of Modern Physics investigating elementary cellular automata (Rule 30 in particular) in June 1983. The unexpected complexity of the behavior of these simple rules led Wolfram to suspect that complexity in nature may be due to similar mechanisms. His investigations, however, led him to realize that cellular automata were poor at modelling neural networks. Additionally, during this period Wolfram formulated the concepts of intrinsic randomness and computational irreducibility, and suggested that Rule 110 may be universal—a fact proved later by Wolfram's research assistant Matthew Cook in the 1990s.

== Classification ==
Stephen Wolfram, in A New Kind of Science and several papers dating from the mid-1980s, defined four classes into which cellular automata and several other simple computational models can be divided depending on their behavior. While earlier studies in cellular automata tended to try to identify types of patterns for specific rules, Wolfram's classification was the first attempt to classify the rules themselves. In order of complexity the classes are:

- Class 1: Nearly all initial patterns evolve quickly into a stable, homogeneous state. Any randomness in the initial pattern disappears.
- Class 2: Nearly all initial patterns evolve quickly into stable or oscillating structures. Some of the randomness in the initial pattern may filter out, but some remains. Local changes to the initial pattern tend to remain local.
- Class 3: Nearly all initial patterns evolve in a pseudo-random or chaotic manner. Any stable structures that appear are quickly destroyed by the surrounding noise. Local changes to the initial pattern tend to spread indefinitely.
- Class 4: Nearly all initial patterns evolve into structures that interact in complex and interesting ways, with the formation of local structures that are able to survive for long periods of time. Class 2 type stable or oscillating structures may be the eventual outcome, but the number of steps required to reach this state may be very large, even when the initial pattern is relatively simple. Local changes to the initial pattern may spread indefinitely. Wolfram has conjectured that many class 4 cellular automata, if not all, are capable of universal computation. This has been proven for Rule 110 and Conway's Game of Life.

These definitions are qualitative in nature and there is some room for interpretation. According to Wolfram, "...with almost any general classification scheme there are inevitably cases which get assigned to one class by one definition and another class by another definition. And so it is with cellular automata: there are occasionally rules...that show some features of one class and some of another."

There have been several attempts to classify cellular automata in formally rigorous classes, inspired by Wolfram's classification. For instance, Culik and Yu proposed three well-defined classes (and a fourth one for the automata not matching any of these), which are sometimes called Culik–Yu classes; membership in these proved undecidable. Wolfram's class 2 can be partitioned into two subgroups of stable (fixed-point) and oscillating (periodic) rules.

The idea that there are 4 classes of dynamical system came originally from Nobel-prize winning chemist Ilya Prigogine who identified these 4 classes of thermodynamical systems: (1) systems in thermodynamic equilibrium, (2) spatially/temporally uniform systems, (3) chaotic systems, and (4) complex far-from-equilibrium systems with dissipative structures (see figure 1 in the 1974 paper of Nicolis, Prigogine's student).

=== Reversible ===
A cellular automaton is reversible if, for every current configuration of the cellular automaton, there is exactly one past configuration (preimage). If one thinks of a cellular automaton as a function mapping configurations to configurations, reversibility implies that this function is bijective. If a cellular automaton is reversible, its time-reversed behavior can also be described as a cellular automaton; this fact is a consequence of the Curtis–Hedlund–Lyndon theorem, a topological characterization of cellular automata. For cellular automata in which not every configuration has a preimage, the configurations without preimages are called Garden of Eden patterns.

For one-dimensional cellular automata there are known algorithms for deciding whether a rule is reversible or irreversible. However, for cellular automata of two or more dimensions reversibility is undecidable; that is, there is no algorithm that takes as input an automaton rule and is guaranteed to determine correctly whether the automaton is reversible. The proof by Jarkko Kari is related to the tiling problem by Wang tiles. When a 2D automata is not reversible, often the proof can be trivial as distinct patterns that map to the same state can be quite common.

Reversible cellular automata are often used to simulate such physical phenomena as gas and fluid dynamics, since they obey the laws of thermodynamics. Such cellular automata have rules specially constructed to be reversible. Such systems have been studied by Tommaso Toffoli, Norman Margolus and others. Several techniques can be used to explicitly construct reversible cellular automata with known inverses. Two common ones are the second-order cellular automaton and the block cellular automaton, both of which involve modifying the definition of a cellular automaton in some way. Although such automata do not strictly satisfy the definition given above, it can be shown that they can be emulated by conventional cellular automata with sufficiently large neighborhoods and numbers of states, and can therefore be considered a subset of conventional cellular automata. Conversely, it has been shown that every reversible cellular automaton can be emulated by a block cellular automaton.

=== Totalistic ===
A special class of cellular automata are totalistic cellular automata. The state of each cell in a totalistic cellular automaton is represented by a number (usually an integer value drawn from a finite set), and the value of a cell at time t depends only on the sum of the values of the cells in its neighborhood (possibly including the cell itself) at time t − 1.

If the state of the cell at time t depends on both its own state and the total of its neighbors at time t − 1 then the cellular automaton is properly called outer totalistic. Conway's Game of Life is outer totalistic (but not totalistic), with cell values 0 and 1. Outer totalistic cellular automata with the same Moore neighborhood structure as Life are sometimes called life-like cellular automata.

More generally, an isotropic ruleset is one that is not necessarily outer totalistic, but still has all the reflection symmetries. In the case of a cellular automata on a square grid, the group of symmetries is D8.

=== Related automata ===
There are many possible generalizations of the cellular automaton concept.

A cellular automaton based on hexagonal cells instead of squares (rule 34/2)

One way is by using something other than a rectangular (cubic, etc.) grid. For example, if a plane is tiled with regular hexagons, those hexagons could be used as cells. In many cases the resulting cellular automata are equivalent to those with rectangular grids with specially designed neighborhoods and rules. Another variation would be to make the grid itself irregular, such as with Penrose tiles.

Also, rules can be probabilistic rather than deterministic. Such cellular automata are called probabilistic cellular automata. A probabilistic rule gives, for each pattern at time t, the probabilities that the central cell will transition to each possible state at time t + 1. Sometimes a simpler rule is used; for example: "The rule is the Game of Life, but on each time step there is a 0.001% probability that each cell will transition to the opposite color."

The neighborhood or rules could change over time or space. For example, initially the new state of a cell could be determined by the horizontally adjacent cells, but for the next generation the vertical cells would be used.

In cellular automata, the new state of a cell is not affected by the new state of other cells. This could be changed so that, for instance, a 2 by 2 block of cells can be determined by itself and the cells adjacent to itself.

There are continuous automata. These are like totalistic cellular automata, but instead of the rule and states being discrete (e.g. a table, using states {0,1,2}), continuous functions are used, and the states become continuous (usually values in [0,1]). The state of a location is a finite number of real numbers. Certain cellular automata can yield diffusion in liquid patterns in this way.

Continuous spatial automata have a continuum of locations. The state of a location is a finite number of real numbers. Time is also continuous, and the state evolves according to differential equations. One important example is reaction–diffusion textures, differential equations proposed by Alan Turing to explain how chemical reactions could create the stripes on zebras and spots on leopards. When these are approximated by cellular automata, they often yield similar patterns. MacLennan considers continuous spatial automata as a model of computation.

There are known examples of continuous spatial automata, which exhibit propagating phenomena analogous to gliders in the Game of Life.

Graph rewriting automata are extensions of cellular automata based on graph rewriting systems.

== Elementary cellular automata ==
The simplest nontrivial cellular automaton would be one-dimensional, with two possible states per cell, and a cell's neighbors defined as the adjacent cells on either side of it. A cell and its two neighbors form a neighborhood of 3 cells, so there are 2^{3} = 8 possible patterns for a neighborhood. A rule consists of deciding, for each pattern, whether the cell will be a 1 or a 0 in the next generation. There are then 2^{8} = 256 possible rules.

An animation of the way the rules of a 1D cellular automaton determine the next generation

These 256 cellular automata are generally referred to by their Wolfram code, a standard naming convention invented by Wolfram that gives each rule a number from 0 to 255. A number of papers have analyzed and compared the distinct cases among the 256 cellular automata (many are trivially isomorphic). The rule 30, rule 90, rule 110, and rule 184 cellular automata are particularly interesting. The images below show the history of rules 30 and 110 when the starting configuration consists of a 1 (at the top of each image) surrounded by 0s. Each row of pixels represents a generation in the history of the automaton, with t=0 being the top row. Each pixel is colored white for 0 and black for 1.

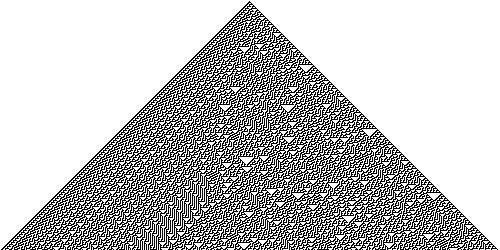
Rule 30

Rule 30 cellular automaton (binary 00011110 = decimal 30)
current pattern	111	110	101	100	011	010	001	000
new state for center cell	0	0	0	1	1	1	1	0

Rule 30 exhibits class 3 behavior, meaning even simple input patterns such as that shown lead to chaotic, seemingly random histories.

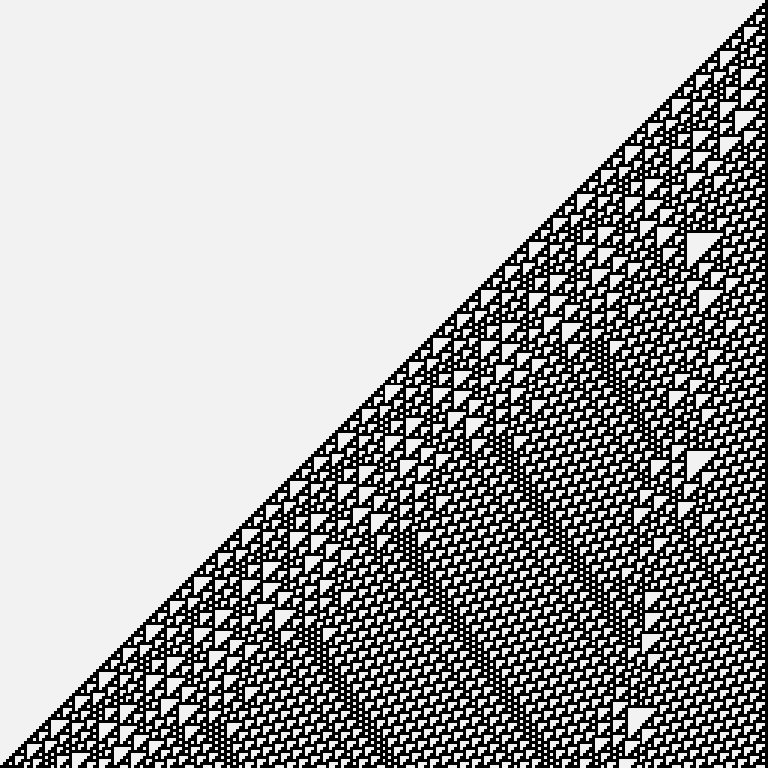
256 iterations of Rule 110

Rule 110 cellular automaton (binary 01101110 = decimal 110)
current pattern	111	110	101	100	011	010	001	000
new state for center cell	0	1	1	0	1	1	1	0

Rule 110, like the Game of Life, exhibits what Wolfram calls class 4 behavior, which is neither completely random nor completely repetitive. Localized structures appear and interact in various complicated-looking ways. In the course of the development of A New Kind of Science, as a research assistant to Wolfram in 1994, Matthew Cook proved that some of these structures were rich enough to support universality. This result is interesting because rule 110 is an extremely simple one-dimensional system, and difficult to engineer to perform specific behavior. This result therefore provides significant support for Wolfram's view that class 4 systems are inherently likely to be universal. Cook presented his proof at a Santa Fe Institute conference on Cellular Automata in 1998, but Wolfram blocked the proof from being included in the conference proceedings, as Wolfram did not want the proof announced before the publication of A New Kind of Science. In 2004, Cook's proof was finally published in Wolfram's journal Complex Systems (Vol. 15, No. 1), over ten years after Cook came up with it. Rule 110 has been the basis for some of the smallest universal Turing machines.

== Rule space ==
An elementary cellular automaton rule is specified by 8 bits, and all elementary cellular automaton rules can be considered to sit on the vertices of the 8-dimensional unit hypercube. This unit hypercube is the cellular automaton rule space. For next-nearest-neighbor cellular automata, a rule is specified by 2^{5} = 32 bits, and the cellular automaton rule space is a 32-dimensional unit hypercube. A distance between two rules can be defined by the number of steps required to move from one vertex, which represents the first rule, and another vertex, representing another rule, along the edge of the hypercube. This rule-to-rule distance is also called the Hamming distance.

Cellular automaton rule space allows us to ask the question concerning whether rules with similar dynamical behavior are "close" to each other. Graphically drawing a high dimensional hypercube on the 2-dimensional plane remains a difficult task, and one crude locator of a rule in the hypercube is the number of bit-1 in the 8-bit string for elementary rules (or 32-bit string for the next-nearest-neighbor rules). Drawing the rules in different Wolfram classes in these slices of the rule space show that class 1 rules tend to have lower number of bit-1s, thus located in one region of the space, whereas class 3 rules tend to have higher proportion (50%) of bit-1s.

For larger cellular automaton rule space, it is shown that class 4 rules are located between the class 1 and class 3 rules. This observation is the foundation for the phrase edge of chaos, and is reminiscent of the phase transition in thermodynamics.

== Applications ==
=== Biology ===
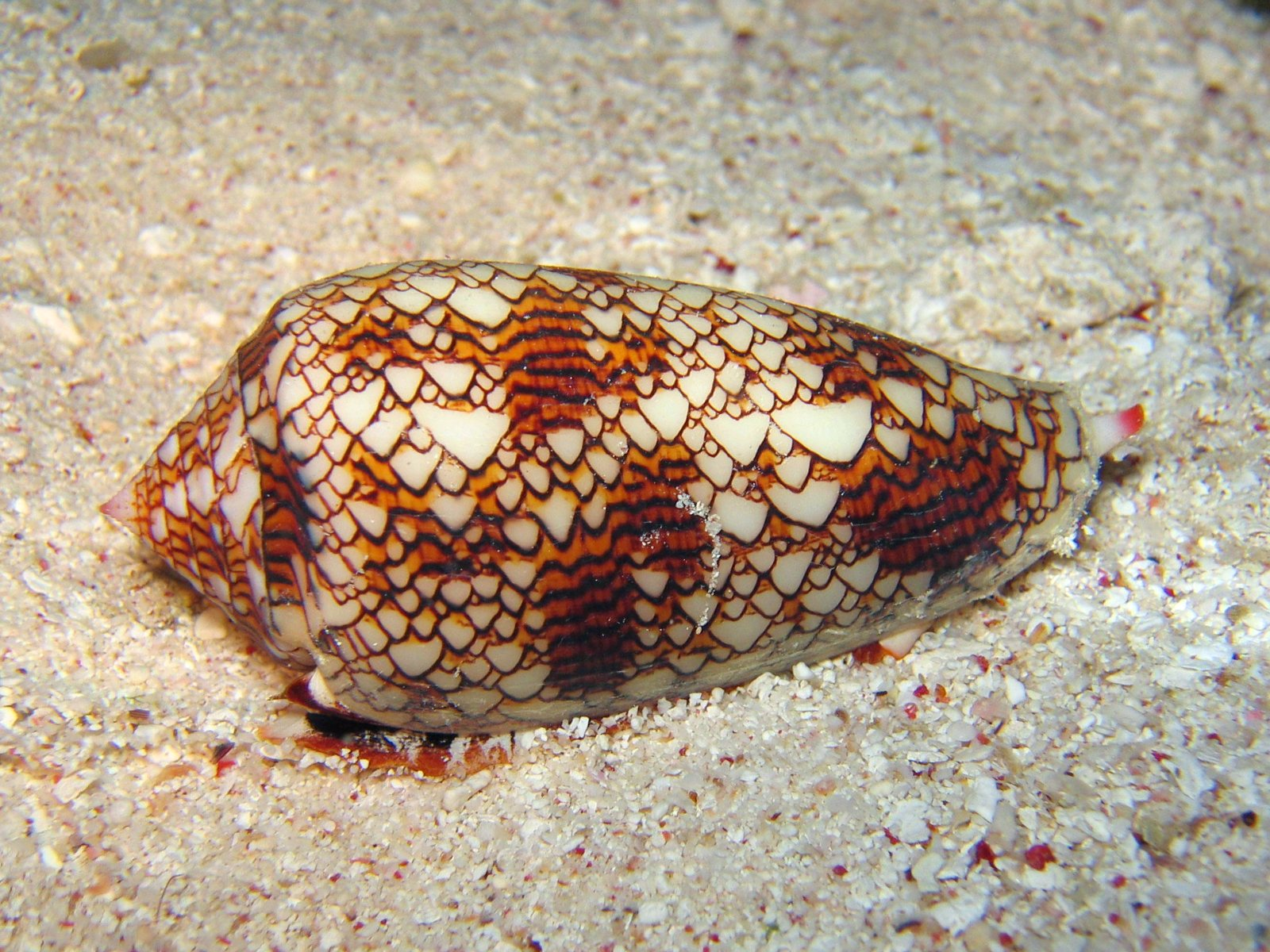
Conus textile exhibits a cellular automaton pattern on its shell.

Several biological processes or phenomena can be simulated using cellular automata, which is regarded as a specific type of agent-based model in such application contexts. In these biological simulations, it is common for the cells of the cellular automaton to be identified with biological cells.

Some examples of biological phenomena modeled by cellular automata with a simple state space are:

- Patterns of some seashells, like the ones in the genera Conus and Cymbiola, are generated by natural cellular automata. The pigment cells reside in a narrow band along the shell's lip. Each cell secretes pigments according to the activating and inhibiting activity of its neighbor pigment cells, obeying a natural version of a mathematical rule. The cell band leaves the colored pattern on the shell as it grows slowly. For example, the widespread species Conus textile bears a pattern resembling Wolfram's rule 30 cellular automaton.
- Plants regulate their intake and loss of gases via a cellular automaton mechanism. Each stoma on the leaf acts as a cell.
- Moving wave patterns on the skin of cephalopods can be simulated with a two-state, two-dimensional cellular automata, each state corresponding to either an expanded or retracted chromatophore.
- Threshold automata have been invented to simulate neurons, and complex behaviors such as recognition and learning can be simulated.
- Fibroblasts bear similarities to cellular automata, as each fibroblast only interacts with its neighbors.

Additionally, biological phenomena which require explicit modeling of the agents' velocities (for example, those involved in collective cell migration) may be modeled by cellular automata with a more complex state space and rules, such as biological lattice-gas cellular automata. These include phenomena of great medical importance, such as:

- Characterization of different modes of metastatic invasion.
- The role of heterogeneity in the development of aggressive carcinomas.
- Phenotypic switching during tumor proliferation.

=== Chemistry ===
The Belousov–Zhabotinsky reaction is a spatio-temporal chemical oscillator that can be simulated by means of a cellular automaton. In the 1950s A. M. Zhabotinsky (extending the work of B. P. Belousov) discovered that when a thin, homogenous layer of a mixture of malonic acid, acidified bromate, and a ceric salt were mixed together and left undisturbed, fascinating geometric patterns such as concentric circles and spirals propagate across the medium. In the "Computer Recreations" section of the August 1988 issue of Scientific American, A. K. Dewdney discussed a cellular automaton developed by Martin Gerhardt and Heike Schuster of the University of Bielefeld (Germany). This automaton produces wave patterns that resemble those in the Belousov-Zhabotinsky reaction. Combining the attachment to one only particle from the growing aggregate, following the seminal model of Witten and Sander to simulate the diffusion-limited growth with the attachment to kink positions as proposed yet by Kossel and Stranski in the 1920s, see for the kinetics-limited version of the attachment, Goranova et al. proposed a model for electrochemical co-deposition of two metal cations.

=== Physics ===
Visualization of a lattice gas automaton. The shades of grey of the individual pixels are proportional to the gas particle density (between 0 and 4) at that pixel. The gas is surrounded by a shell of black cells that act as reflectors to create a closed space.

Probabilistic cellular automata are used in statistical and condensed matter physics to study phenomena like fluid dynamics and phase transitions. The Ising model is a prototypical example, in which each cell can be in either of two states called "up" and "down", making an idealized representation of a magnet. By adjusting the parameters of the model, the proportion of cells being in the same state can be varied, in ways that help explicate how ferromagnets become demagnetized when heated. Moreover, results from studying the demagnetization phase transition can be transferred to other phase transitions, like the evaporation of a liquid into a gas; this convenient cross-applicability is known as universality. The phase transition in the two-dimensional Ising model and other systems in its universality class has been of particular interest, as it requires conformal field theory to understand in depth.

Other cellular automata that have been of significance in physics include lattice gas automata, which simulate fluid flows. In a series of works the so-called vicinal Cellular Automaton (vicCA) was proposed and further developed to model the possibly unstable growth and sublimation of vicinal crystal surfaces in 1+1D. Besides the attachment/detachment events being encoded in the rules of the CA, the adatoms on top of the vicinal form a thin layer, and their thermal motion is modeled by a Monte Carlo module. A decisive step further was the transition of the model to 2+1D, where a number of different structures were obtained, referred to by the authors as "vicinal creatures"—step bunches, step meanders, nano-pillars, nanowires, etc. The vicCA model was extensively used by Alexey Redkov to develop a Machine Learning algorithm on top of it, significantly speeding up calculations by a factor of 10^{5} while enabling systematic classification of the observed phenomena.

=== Computer science, coding, and communication ===
Cellular automaton processors are physical implementations of CA concepts, which can process information computationally. Processing elements are arranged in a regular grid of identical cells. The grid is usually a square tiling, or tessellation, of two or three dimensions; other tilings are possible, but not yet used. Cell states are determined only by interactions with adjacent neighbor cells. No means exists to communicate directly with cells farther away. One such cellular automaton processor array configuration is the systolic array. Cell interaction can be via electric charge, magnetism, vibration (phonons at quantum scales), or any other physically useful means. This can be done in several ways so that no wires are needed between any elements. This is very unlike processors used in most computers today (von Neumann designs) which are divided into sections with elements that can communicate with distant elements over wires.

Rule 30 was originally suggested as a possible block cipher for use in cryptography. Two-dimensional cellular automata can be used for constructing a pseudorandom number generator. Cellular automata have been proposed for public-key cryptography. The one-way function is the evolution of a finite CA whose inverse is believed to be hard to find. Given the rule, anyone can easily calculate future states, but it appears to be very difficult to calculate previous states. Cellular automata have also been applied to design error correction codes.

Other problems that can be solved with cellular automata include:

- Firing squad synchronization problem
- Majority problem

=== Generative art and music ===
Cellular automata have been used in generative music and evolutionary music composition and procedural terrain generation in video games.

=== Maze generation ===
Certain types of cellular automata can be used to generate mazes. Two well-known such cellular automata, Maze and Mazectric, have rulestrings B3/S12345 and B3/S1234. In the former, this means that cells survive from one generation to the next if they have at least one and at most five neighbours. In the latter, this means that cells survive if they have one to four neighbours. If a cell has exactly three neighbours, it is born. It is similar to Conway's Game of Life in that patterns that do not have a living cell adjacent to 1, 4, or 5 other living cells in any generation will behave identically to it. However, for large patterns, it behaves very differently from Life.

For a random starting pattern, these maze-generating cellular automata will evolve into complex mazes with well-defined walls outlining corridors. Mazecetric, which has the rule B3/S1234 has a tendency to generate longer and straighter corridors compared with Maze, with the rule B3/S12345. Since these cellular automaton rules are deterministic, each maze generated is uniquely determined by its random starting pattern. This is a significant drawback since the mazes tend to be relatively predictable.

Like some of the graph-theory based methods described above, these cellular automata typically generate mazes from a single starting pattern; hence it will usually be relatively easy to find the way to the starting cell, but harder to find the way anywhere else.

== Specific rules ==
Specific cellular automata rules include:

- Brian's Brain
- Codd's cellular automaton
- CoDi
- Conway's game of life
- Day and Night
- Langton's ant
- Langton's loops
- Lenia
- Nobili cellular automata
- Rule 90
- Rule 184
- Seeds
- Turmite
- Von Neumann cellular automaton
- Wireworld

== See also ==
- Agent-based model – Type of computational models
- Automata theory – Study of abstract machines and automata
- Cyclic cellular automaton
- Discrete calculus – Discrete (i.e., incremental) version of infinitesimal calculus
- Excitable medium – Nonlinear dynamical system
- Golly – Cellular automata simulation software
- Iterative Stencil Loops – Class of data processing algorithms
- Lattice model – Physical model defined on a lattice
- Movable cellular automaton – Method in computational solid mechanics based on the discrete concept
- Quantum cellular automaton – Abstract model of quantum computation
- Spatial decision support system – Computerised aid to land use decisions
- Unconventional computing – Computing by new or unusual methods
