= Von Neumann neighborhood =

Cellular automaton neighborhood consisting of four adjacent cells

Manhattan distance r = 1

Manhattan distance r = 2

In cellular automata, the von Neumann neighborhood (or 4-neighborhood) is classically defined on a two-dimensional square lattice and is composed of a central cell and its four adjacent cells. The neighborhood is named after John von Neumann, who used it to define the von Neumann cellular automaton and the von Neumann universal constructor within it. It is one of the two most commonly used neighborhood types for two-dimensional cellular automata, the other one being the Moore neighborhood.

This neighbourhood can be used to define the notion of 4-connected pixels in computer graphics.

The von Neumann neighbourhood of a cell is the cell itself and the cells at a Manhattan distance of 1.

The concept can be extended to higher dimensions, for example forming a 6-cell octahedral neighborhood for a cubic cellular automaton in three dimensions.

== Von Neumann neighborhood of range r ==
An extension of the simple von Neumann neighborhood described above is to take the set of points at a Manhattan distance of r > 1. This results in a diamond-shaped region (shown for r = 2 in the illustration). These are called von Neumann neighborhoods of range or extent r. The number of cells in a 2-dimensional von Neumann neighborhood of range r can be expressed as $r^2 + (r+1)^2$. The number of cells in a d-dimensional von Neumann neighborhood of range r is the Delannoy number D(d,r). The number of cells on a surface of a d-dimensional von Neumann neighborhood of range r is the Zaitsev number (sequence A266213 in the OEIS).

== See also ==
- Moore neighborhood
- Neighbourhood (graph theory)
- Taxicab geometry
- Lattice graph
- Pixel connectivity
- Chain code
