= Day and Night (cellular automaton) =

2D cellular automaton with black/white reversal symmetry

Gun and antigun demonstrating the symmetry of Day & Night.

Day and Night is a two-dimensional Life-like cellular automaton rule related to Game of Life. It is defined by the rule notation B3678/S34678: a dead cell is born if it has 3, 6, 7, or 8 live neighbors, and a live cell survives if it has 3, 4, 6, 7, or 8 live neighbors, where neighborhoods are taken in the Moore neighborhood. The rule was invented and named in 1997 by Nathan Thompson and was subsequently studied in detail by David I. Bell, who constructed many of the currently known patterns and pattern libraries.

The name "Day & Night" refers to a symmetry between the two cell states: if all live and dead cells in a pattern are inverted, then every future generation of the inverted pattern is the inversion of the corresponding generation of the original pattern. Equivalently, if a cell has exactly 3, 6, 7, or 8 neighbors that are all in the same state (all live or all dead), it takes that state in the next generation; otherwise it does not change. In Wolfram's qualitative classification of cellular automata, Day and Night belongs to class 4, with long-lived, interacting local structures and complex behavior.

== Dynamics and symmetry ==
Because of its black/white reversal symmetry, every finite pattern on an otherwise empty background has a corresponding antipattern obtained by inverting live and dead cells on an otherwise fully live background. The antipattern evolves under the rule exactly as the original pattern does, but with live and dead cells interchanged at every time step. In particular, every localized object has a corresponding antiobject that behaves identically against the inverted background.

The global qualitative evolution differs from Conway's Game of Life, but Day and Night also supports long-lived localized structures. Typical evolutions contain a mixture of stable regions, oscillatory regions, and moving patterns such as spaceships and debris.

== Known patterns ==
Day and Night supports a large variety of small still lifes, oscillators, spaceships, puffers, rakes, and guns. Many examples arise spontaneously from low-density starting patterns and have been catalogued in pattern collections.

In particular, Bell identified a comparatively complex spaceship of period 40, usually called the rocket, that occurs frequently in random evolutions and can be used as a component in larger engineered patterns such as guns and reflectors.

A selection of small patterns includes:

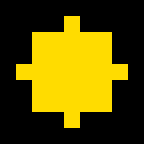
White dwarf – a 29-cell still life

Oscillator of period 16

Oscillator of period 4

Oscillators of period 2

Butterfly – diagonal spaceship of period 3 and speed c / 3

Additional notable spaceships and composites include:

Snail – orthogonal spaceship of period 14 and speed c / 7

Spaceship of period 4 and speed c / 2 with an antispaceship of period 2 and speed c / 2

Large mothership spaceship containing two smaller antispaceships (periods 4, speeds c / 2)

Guns and related engineered patterns are also known. For example, there are guns that periodically emit rockets and their antirockets, and guns that emit butterflies:

Gun and antigun that emit rockets and antirockets; transient white dwarf still lifes appear inside the guns

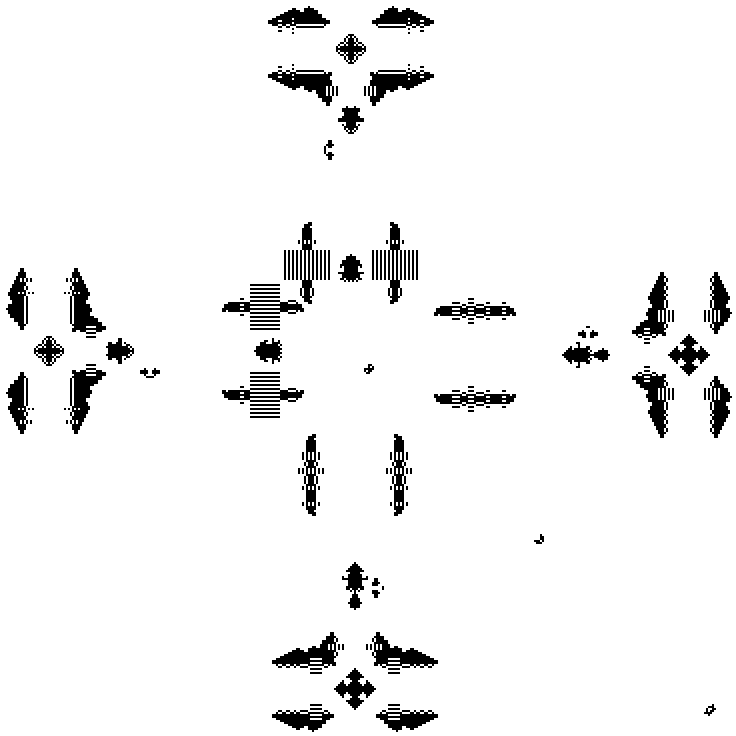
Gun that emits butterflies (period 256)

By combining still lifes, oscillators, and spaceships, it is possible to construct reflectors, eaters, and logical signal-processing components that emulate logic gates and information channels. Signal transmission can be arranged between regions dominated by live cells (day) and regions dominated by dead cells (night), exploiting the underlying symmetry.

== Evolution from random initial conditions ==
For random initial conditions in which each cell is independently chosen to be live with probability 1/2, the large-scale evolution is characterized by the formation and gradual coarsening of large day and night regions. These regions merge into increasingly larger connected components, while their boundaries exhibit persistent local activity.

Along the interfaces between such regions, small patterns are continually created and destroyed, and occasional larger excursions of one phase into the other occur. The boundary dynamics tend to smooth small protrusions and indentations, analogous to an effective surface tension, while the interior of each region typically stabilizes to a mixture of small still lifes and oscillators.

The following sequence shows an example evolution on an 800 × 600 toroidal grid (opposite edges identified):

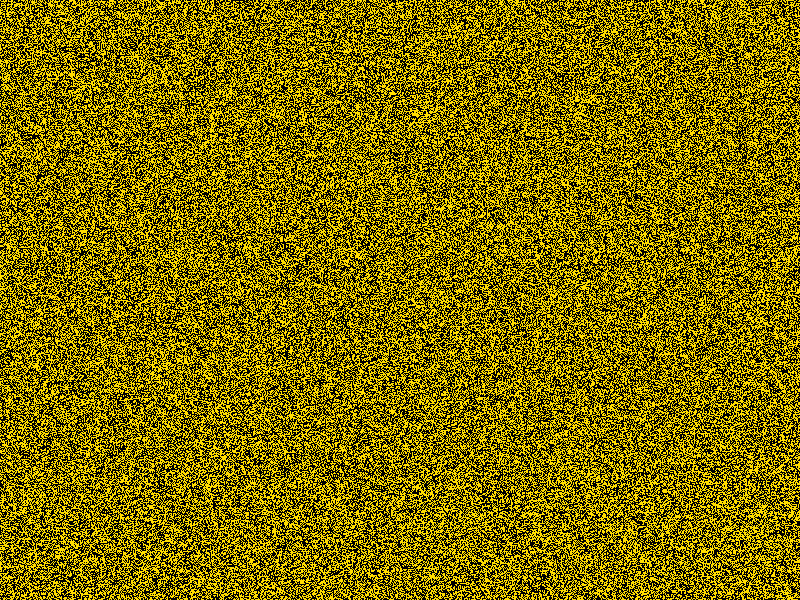
Generation 0: random initial configuration

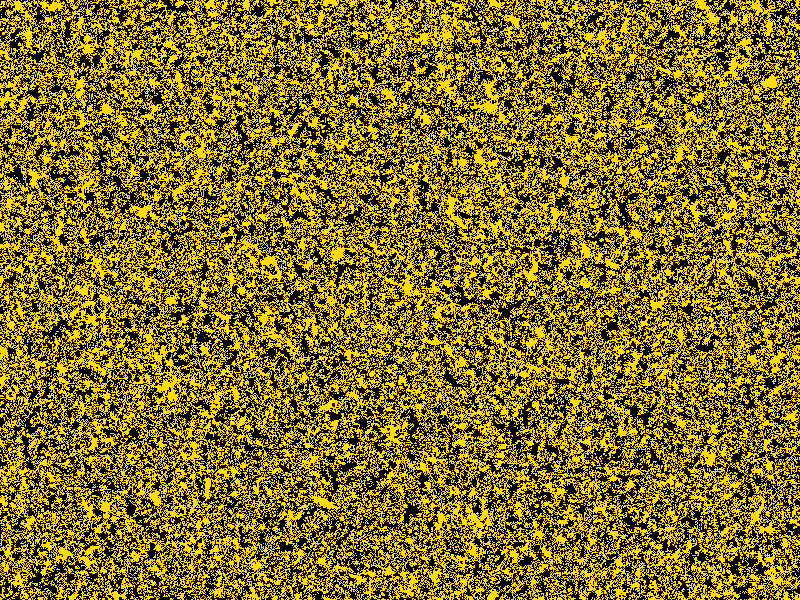
Generation 10

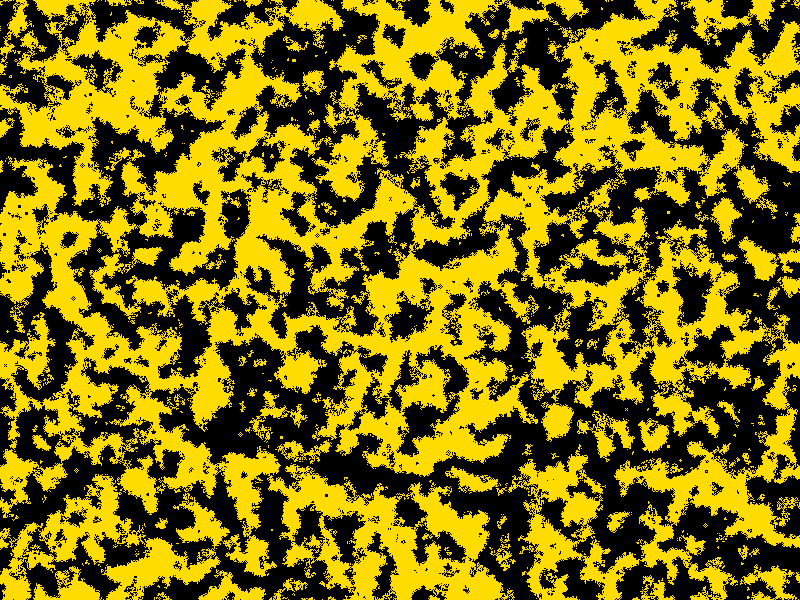
Generation 100

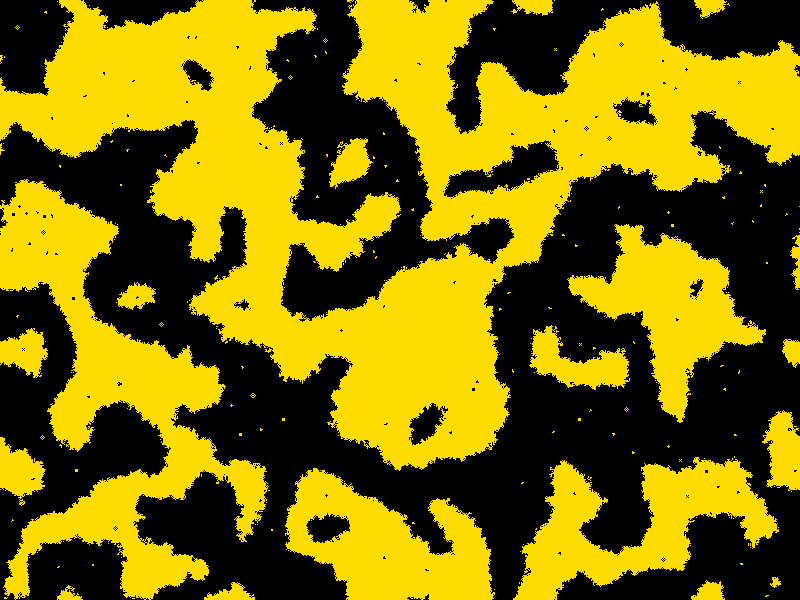
Generation 1,000

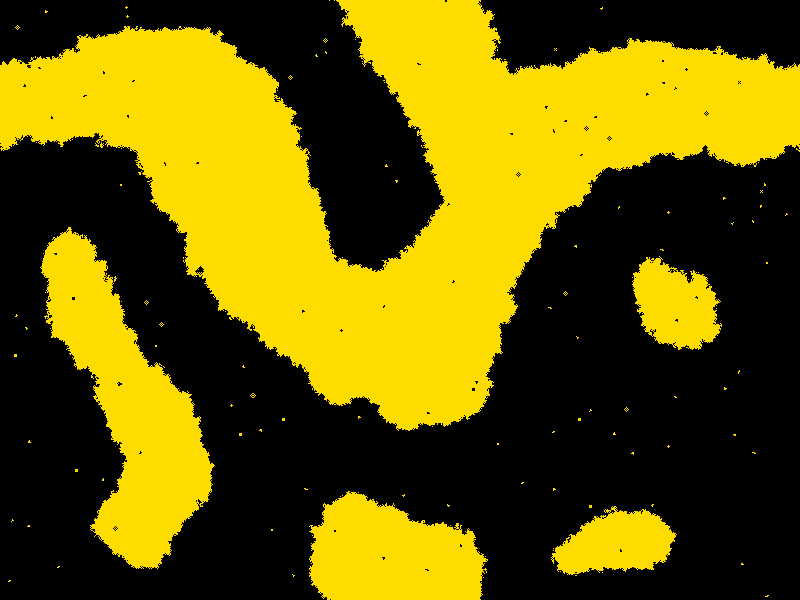
Generation 10,000

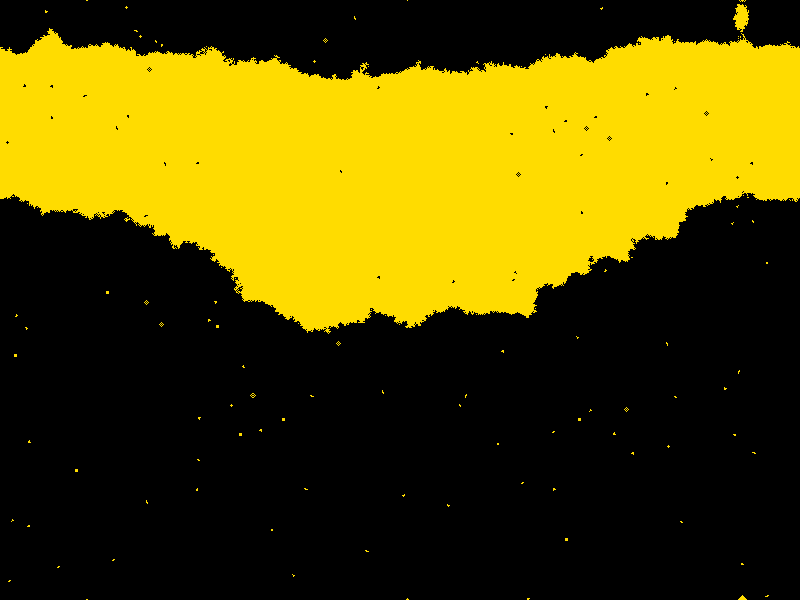
Generation 100,000
