= Rake (cellular automaton) =

Type of moving pattern which periodically produces spaceships

A rake, in the lexicon of cellular automata, is a type of puffer train, which is an automaton that leaves behind a trail of debris. In the case of a rake, however, the debris left behind is a stream of spaceships, which are automata that "travel" by looping through a short series of iterations and end up in a new location after each cycle returns to the original configuration.

A selection of rakes in Conway's Game of Life

In Conway's Game of Life, the discovery of rakes was one of the key components needed to form the breeder, the first known pattern in Life in which the number of live cells exhibits quadratic growth. A breeder is formed by arranging several rakes so that the gliders—the smallest possible spaceships—they generate interact to form a sequence of glider guns, patterns which emit gliders. The emitted gliders fill a growing triangle of the plane of the game. More generally, when a rake exists for a cellular automaton rule (a mathematical function defining the next iteration to be derived from a particular configuration of live and dead cells), one can often construct puffers which leave trails of many other kinds of objects, by colliding the streams of spaceships emitted by multiple rakes moving in parallel. As David Bell writes:

They are extremely important in Life because the output can be used to construct other objects and can pass signals around to perform logic operations. Whenever any new puffer engine is found an important goal is to "tame" it so that its useless "dirty" exhaust is converted into "clean" exhaust, particularly gliders.

The "space rake", which moves orthogonally ten units through a twenty step cycle, emitting one glider per cycle

The first rake to be discovered, in the early 1970s, was the "space rake", which moves with speed c/2 (or one unit every two steps), emitting a glider every twenty steps. For Life, rakes are now known that move orthogonally with speeds c/2, c/3, c/4, c/5, 2c/5, 2c/7, c/10 and 17c/45, and diagonally with speeds c/4 and c/12, with many different periods. Rakes are also known for some other life-like cellular automata, including Highlife, Day & Night, and Seeds.

Gotts (1980) shows that the space rake in Life can be formed by a "standard collision sequence" in which a single glider interacts with a widely separated set of 3-cell initial seeds (blinkers and blocks). As a consequence, he finds lower bounds on the probability that these patterns form in any sufficiently sparse and sufficiently large random initial condition for Life. This result leads to standard collision sequences for many other patterns such as breeders.
