= Spark (cellular automaton) =

Type of pattern which temporarily appears at the edge of a larger pattern

The fumarole, a period-5 oscillator in Conway's Game of Life. The two live cells appearing at the top of the pattern every five generations are considered a spark.

In Conway's Game of Life and similar cellular automaton rules, a spark is a small collection of live cells that appears at the edge of some larger pattern such as a spaceship or oscillator, then quickly dies off.

Sparks are commonly separated by some distance from the main body of the pattern -- the analogy is to an object "throwing off sparks" -- but the minimum requirement is a set of cells on the pattern boundary that are alive in one phase but dead in a later phase, and that are unaffected by other parts of the pattern (they would die in the same way if the rest of the pattern were removed). The converse is not necessarily true: for example, removing the spark in the accompanying illustration would destabilize the fumarole. (Most spark-producing oscillators have this property.)

Sparks are an important way for components of a larger pattern to interact with each other; for instance, Niemiec describes the use of sparks formed by colliding gliders as part of the synthesis of other life objects. Bell writes that lightweight, mediumweight, and heavyweight spaceships in Life are especially useful because they all have small sparks which may be used to perturb nearby puffer trains and stationary patterns as the spaceships pass by them.
