= Hashlife =

Algorithm for speeding up cellular automaton simulations

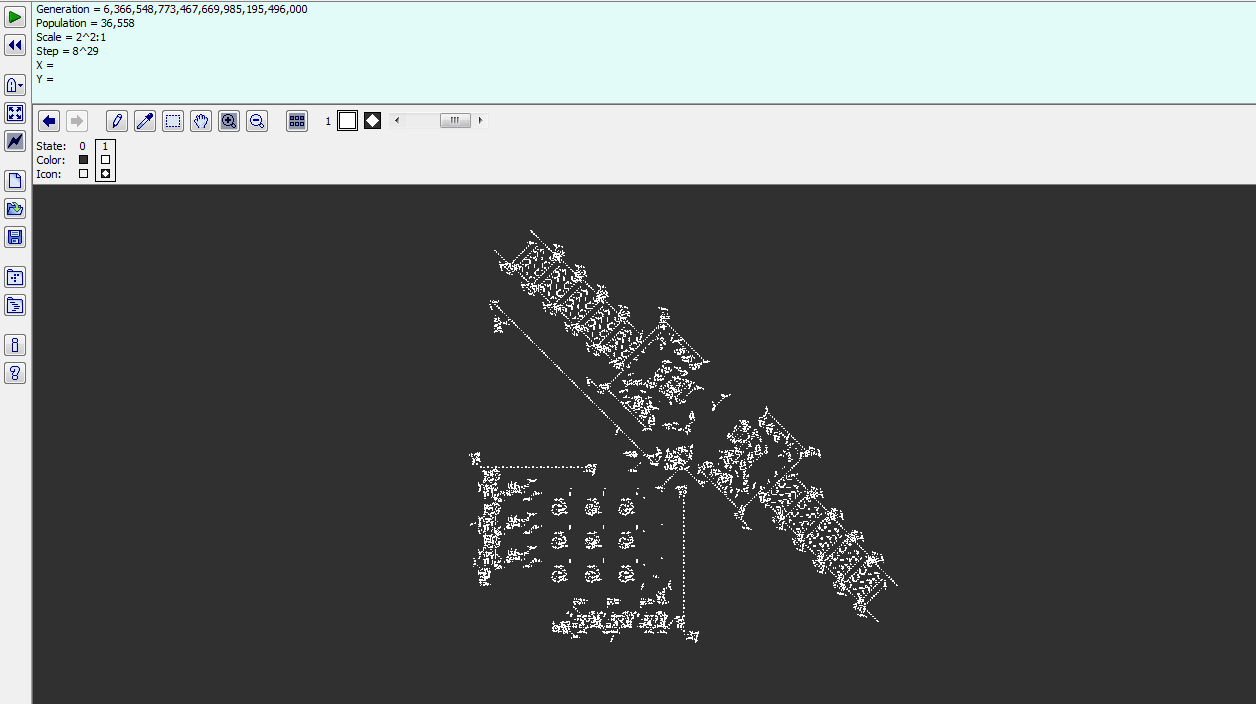
The 6,366,548,773,467,669,985,195,496,000 (6 octillionth) generation of a Turing machine in Life computed in less than 30 seconds on an Intel Core Duo 2GHz CPU using Hashlife in Golly. Computed by detecting a repeating cycle in the pattern, and skipping ahead to any requested generation.

Hashlife is a memoized algorithm for computing the long-term fate of a given starting configuration in Conway's Game of Life and related cellular automata, much more quickly than would be possible using alternative algorithms that simulate each time step of each cell of the automaton. The algorithm was first described by Bill Gosper in the early 1980s while he was engaged in research at the Xerox Palo Alto Research Center. Hashlife was originally implemented on Symbolics Lisp machines with the aid of the Flavors extension.

== Hashlife ==
Hashlife is designed to exploit large amounts of spatial and temporal redundancy in most Life rules. For example, in Conway's Life, many seemingly random patterns end up as collections of simple still lifes and oscillators. However, Hashlife does not depend on patterns remaining in the same position; it is more about exploiting that large patterns tend to have subpatterns that appear in several places, possibly at different times.

=== Representation ===
The field is typically treated as a theoretically infinite grid, with the pattern in question centered near the origin. A quadtree (with sharing of nodes) is used to represent the field. A node at the kth level of the tree represents a square of 2^{2k} cells, 2^{k} on a side, by referencing the four k–1 level nodes that represent the four $2^{k-1} \times 2^{k-1}$ quadrants of that level k square. For example, a level 3 node represents an 8×8 square, which decomposes into four 4×4 squares. Explicit cell contents are only stored at level 0. The root node has to be within a square of all live cells it represents.

While a quadtree naively seems to require far more overhead than simpler representations (such as using a matrix of bits), it allows for various optimizations. Since each cell is either live or dead, there are only two possibilities for a node at level 0, so if nodes are allowed to be shared between parents, there is never a need for having more than 2 level 0 nodes in total. Likewise the 4 cells of a 2×2 square can only exhibit $2^4 = 16$ different combinations, so no more than that many level 1 nodes are needed either. Going to higher levels, the number of possible kth level squares grows as $2^{2^k \cdot 2^k} = 2^{2^{2k}}$, but the number of distinct kth level squares occurring in any particular run is much lower, and very often the same square contents appears in several places. For maximal sharing of nodes in the quadtree (which is not so much a tree as a directed acyclic graph), we only want to use one node to represent all squares with the same content.

=== Hashing ===
A hash table, or more generally any kind of associative array, may be used to map square contents to an already existing node representing those contents, so that one through the technique of hash consing may avoid creating a duplicate node representing those contents. If this is applied consistently then it is sufficient to hash the four pointers to component nodes, as a bottom–up hashing of the square contents would always find those four nodes at the level below. It turns out several operations on higher level nodes can be carried out without explicitly producing the contents of those nodes, instead it suffices to work with pointers to nodes a fixed number of levels down.

=== Caching and superspeed ===
The quadtree can be augmented to in a node also cache the result of an update on the contents of that node. There is not enough information in a $2^k \times 2^k$ square to determine the next timestep contents on the whole of that square, but the contents of a $2^{k+1} \times 2^{k+1}$ square centered at the same point determine the next timestep contents of the $2^k \times 2^k$ square. This level k node for that next timestep is offset by $2^{k-1}$ cells in both the horizontal and vertical directions, so even in the case of still life it would likely not be among the level k nodes that combine into the $2^{k+1} \times 2^{k+1}$ square, but at level k–1 the squares are again in the same positions and will be shared if unchanged.

Practically, computing the next timestep contents is a recursive operation that bottom–up populates the cache field of each level k node with a level k–1 node representing the contents of the updated center $2^{k-1} \times 2^{k-1}$ square. Sharing of nodes can bring a significant speed-up to this operation, since the work required is proportional to the number of nodes, not to the number of cells as in a simpler representation. If nodes are being shared between quadtrees representing different timesteps, then only those nodes which were newly created during the previous timestep will need to have a cached value computed at all.

Superspeed goes further, using the observation that the contents of a $2^{k+1} \times 2^{k+1}$ square actually determine the contents of its central $2^k \times 2^k$ square for the next $2^{k-1}$ timesteps. Instead of having a level k node cache a level k–1 node for the contents 1 step ahead, we can have it cache one for the contents $2^{k-2}$ steps ahead. Because updates at level k are computed from updates at level k–1, and since at level k–1 there are cached results for advancing $2^{k-3}$ timesteps, a mere two rounds of advancing at level k–1 suffice for advancing by $2^{k-2}$ steps at level k.

In the worst case 2 rounds at level k–1 may have to do 4 full rounds at level k–2, in turn calling for 8 full rounds at level k–3, etc., but in practice many subpatterns in the tree are identical to each other and most branches of the recursion are short. For example, the pattern being studied may contain many copies of the same spaceship, and often large swathes of empty space. Each instance of these subpatterns will hash to the same quadtree node, and thus only need to be stored once. In addition, these subpatterns only need to be evaluated once, not once per copy as in other Life algorithms.

For sparse or repetitive patterns such as the classical glider gun, this can result in tremendous speedups, allowing one to compute bigger patterns at higher generations faster, sometimes exponentially. A generation of the various breeders and spacefillers, which grow at polynomial speeds, can be evaluated in Hashlife using logarithmic space and time.

Since subpatterns of different sizes are effectively run at different speeds, some implementations, like Gosper's own hlife program, do not have an interactive display; they simply advance the starting pattern a given number of steps, and are usually run from the command line. More recent programs such as Golly, however, have a graphical interface that can drive a Hashlife-based engine.

The typical behavior of a Hashlife program on a conducive pattern is as follows: first the algorithm runs slower compared to other algorithms because of the constant overhead associated with hashing and building the tree; but later, enough data will be gathered and its speed will increase tremendously – the rapid increase in speed is often described as "exploding".

== Drawbacks ==
Like many memoized codes, Hashlife can consume significantly more memory than other algorithms, especially on moderate-sized patterns with a lot of entropy, or which contain subpatterns poorly aligned to the bounds of the quadtree nodes (i.e. power-of-two sizes); the cache is a vulnerable component. It can also consume more time than other algorithms on these patterns. Golly, among other Life simulators, has options for toggling between Hashlife and conventional algorithms.

Hashlife is also significantly more complex to implement. For example, it needs a dedicated garbage collector to remove unused nodes from the cache.

Due to being designed for processing generally predictable patterns, chaotic and explosive rules generally operate much more poorly under Hashlife than they would under other implementations.

== See also ==
- Purely functional data structure, of which the hashed quadtree is one
- Hash consing, which was the key strategy used in the original implementation of Hashlife.
