= Spacefiller =

Spreading pattern in cellular automata

Spacefiller showing the moving leading edges and the stationary still life it leaves.

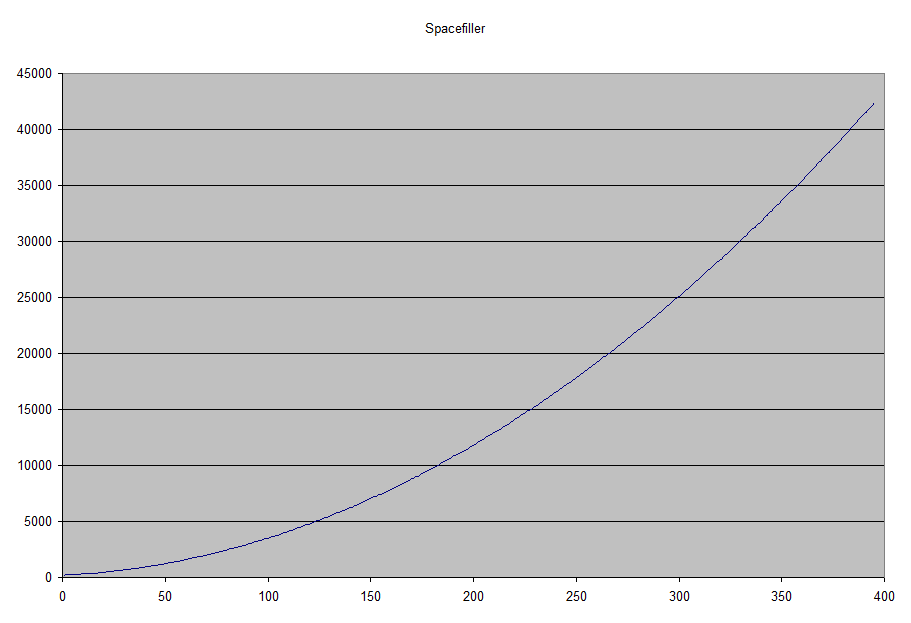
The cell count per generation of the above spacefiller pattern clearly showing its quadratic growth.

In Conway's Game of Life and related cellular automata, a spacefiller is a pattern that spreads out indefinitely, eventually filling the entire space with a still life pattern. It typically consists of three components: stretchers that resemble spaceships at the four corners of the pattern, a growing boundary region along the edges of the pattern, and the still life in the interior region.

It resembles a breeder in that both types of patterns have a quadratic growth rate in their numbers of live cells, and both share a three-component architecture. However, in a breeder the moving part of the breeder (corresponding to the stretcher) leaves behind a fixed sequence of glider guns which fill space with gliders, moving objects (gliders or spaceships) rather than still life patterns. With a spacefiller, unlike a breeder, every point in the space eventually becomes part of the space-filling still life pattern.
