= Brian's Brain =

2D cellular automaton devised by Brian Silverman

A typical chaotic Brian's Brain pattern showing spaceships, rakes and diagonal waves. In this animation, the on cells are white and the dying cells are blue.

Brian's Brain is a cellular automaton devised by Brian Silverman, which is very similar to his Seeds rule.

== Rules ==
Brian's Brain consists of an infinite two-dimensional grid of cells, but unlike Seeds, each cell may be in one of three states: on, dying, or off. Each cell is considered to have eight neighbors (the Moore neighborhood), as in Seeds and Conway's Game of Life.

In each time step, a cell turns on if it was off but had exactly two neighbors that were on, just like the birth rule for Seeds. All cells that were "on" go into the "dying" state, which is not counted as an "on" cell in the neighbor count, and prevents any cell from being born there. Cells that were in the dying state go into the off state.

== Behavior ==
Because of the cellular automaton's name, some websites compare the automaton to a brain and each of its cells to a neuron, which can be in three different states: ready (off), firing (on), and refractory (dying).

An oscillator in Brian's Brain.

The "dying state" cells tend to lead to directional movement, so almost every pattern in Brian's Brain is a spaceship. Many spaceships are rakes, which emit other spaceships. Another result is that many Brian's Brain patterns will explode messily and chaotically, and often will result in or contain great diagonal waves of on and dying cells. For example, a 2×2 block of on cells will result in an ever-expanding diamond consisting of four diagonal waves that move across the plane at the pattern's speed of light.

Nevertheless, oscillators have been constructed in Brian's Brain. An example has just four on cells and four dying cells, and oscillates with period 3.
