= 3D Life =

Cellular automaton

3D Life is a three-dimensional extension and exploration in the variants of Conway's Game of Life. It was first discovered by Carter Bays. A number of different semitotalistic rules for the 3D rectangular Moore neighborhood were investigated. It was popularized by A. K. Dewdney in his "Computer Recreations" column in Scientific American magazine.

== Background ==
=== Recontextualizing Conway's Game of Life ===
In every step of Conway's Game of Life follows four rules:

1. Any live cell with fewer than two live neighbors dies, as if by underpopulation.
2. Any live cell with two or three live neighbors lives on to the next generation.
3. Any live cell with more than three live neighbors dies, as if by overpopulation.
4. Any dead cell with exactly three live neighbors becomes a live cell, as if by reproduction.

These events may be simplified in a way where we emphasize a given cells next state based on the range of the number of that cell's neighbors

1. Any live cell with between two and three live neighbors continues to live on to the next generation; otherwise, the cell dies or expires
2. Any dead cell with exactly three neighbors (between three and three) becomes a live cell, as if by fertilization.

This reworking of the rules allows us to formalize them. We define $E$ as the number of living neighbors required to prevent a currently living cell from dying, which upper and lower limits $E_l$ and $E_u$ respectively. Similarly, we define $F$ as the number of living neighbors required to create a new living cell, with upper and lower limits $F_l$ and $F_u$ respectively. We define a transition rule R that states the following:

1. Any live cell with between $E_l$ and $E_u$ live neighbors continues to live on to the next generation; otherwise, the cell dies or expires.
2. Any dead cell between $F_l$ and $F_u$ live neighbors becomes a live cell, as if by fertilization.

This transition rule may further be defined as the 4-tuple $(E_l, E_u, F_l ,F_u)$. For example, Conway's Game of Life has a transition rule $R = (2,3,3,3)$. We can use this transition rule to create different variants of the Game of Life. For instance, an automaton with $R = (3,4,3,4)$ results in an explosive variant of the Game of Life called 3-4 Life, and one of the earliest studied variants of the famous automaton.

=== The third dimension and defining a Game of Life ===
Because of the transition rule's complete independence from the number of dimensions, we may translate the transition rule into the third dimension. Each cell can have from zero to 26 living neighbors, greatly increasing the number of possible rules from 1296 in two dimensions to 123,201 in three dimensions. Unsurprisingly, many of the transition rules either decays too quickly, expands too quickly, or doesn't create anything interesting in a given "primordial soup" seed (ex: gliders, spaceships, blinkers, etc.) We loosely formalize a Game of life like so:

An automaton with a transition rule $R = (E_l, E_u, F_l ,F_u)$ is a Game of Life if and only if both of the following are true.

1. A glider must exist and must occur "naturally" if we apply $E_l, E_u, F_l ,F_u$ repeatedly to primordial soup configurations.
2. All primordial soup configurations, when subjected to $E_l, E_u, F_l ,F_u$ , must exhibit bounded growth.
