= Lisp reader =

In the programming language Lisp, the reader or read function is the parser which converts the textual form of Lisp objects to the corresponding internal object structure.

In the original Lisp, S-expressions consisted only of symbols, integers, and the list constructors ( x_{i}... ) and (x . y). Later Lisps, culminating in Common Lisp, added literals for floating-point, complex, and rational numbers, strings, and constructors for vectors.

The reader is responsible for parsing list structure, interning symbols, converting numbers to internal form, and calling read macros.

== Read table ==
The reader is controlled by the readtable, which defines the meaning of each character.

== Read macros ==
Unlike most programming languages, Lisp supports parse-time execution of programs, called "read macros" or "reader macros". These are used to extend the syntax either in universal or program-specific ways. For example, the quoted form (quote x) operator can be abbreviated as 'x. The ' operator can be defined as a read macro which reads the following list and wraps it with quote. Similarly, the backquote operator (` ) can be defined as a read macro.

== Bibliography ==
- John McCarthy et al., LISP 1.5 Programmer's Manual, MIT Press, 1962.
- David A. Moon, MACLISP Reference Manual, 1974.
- Guy Steele, Common LISP: The Language, Second Edition, 1990.
