= Reflector (cellular automaton) =

Type of pattern that can redirect a stream of incoming spaceships

Oscillators of varying periods that double as glider reflectors highlighted in pink. Click to view animation.

In cellular automata such as Conway's Game of Life, a reflector is a pattern that can interact with a spaceship to change its direction of motion, without damage to the reflector pattern. In Life, many oscillators can reflect the glider; there also exist stable reflectors composed of still life patterns that, when they interact with a glider, reflect the glider and return to their stable state.

== Types ==
As well as whether a reflector is a still life or an oscillator, a reflector might be characterised by the angle between the input and output spaceships (for example a 180° reflector would flip a spaceship). For most (Note: Orthogonal and diagonal ships) spaceships, this can only be 0°, 90°, or 180°. Another property is whether the reflector is colour preserving. That is, if it doesn't change the state of a spaceship as it gets reflected. If a reflector isn't colour preserving, it's known as colour changing.

Buckaroo, a 90° colour preserving reflector
