= Breeder (cellular automaton) =

Type of pattern that grows quadratically

Evolution of an MSM breeder – a puffer that produces Gosper guns, which in turn emit gliders.

In cellular automata such as Conway's Game of Life, a breeder is a pattern that exhibits quadratic growth, by generating multiple copies of a secondary pattern, each of which then generates multiple copies of a tertiary pattern.

== Classification ==
Breeders can be classed by the relative motion of the patterns. The classes are denoted by three-letter codes, which denote whether the primary, secondary and tertiary elements respectively are moving (M) or stationary (S). The four basic types are:

1. SMM – A gun that fires out rakes.
2. MSM – A puffer that leaves guns in its wake.
3. MMS – A rake that fires out puffers.
4. MMM – A rake that fires out more rakes, such that there are no stationary elements.

A spacefiller (which also undergoes quadratic growth) may be thought of as a fifth class of breeder. However it differs from a true breeder in that it expands a single island of cells, rather than creating independent objects. It is known that a fifth class breeder cannot be locked in place.
