= Flyweight (disambiguation) =

Flyweight may mean:

- Flyweight pattern, a software design pattern in computer science;
- Flyweight, a class in boxing;
- Flyweight (MMA), a class in mixed martial arts.
- Fly weight, a weight connected to a spinning axle, as most frequently found in flywheels. However, a fly weight may also be used in other applications, such as for sensing rotation speed in centrifugal governors.
