= LifeWiki =

Wiki dedicated to Conway's Game of Life

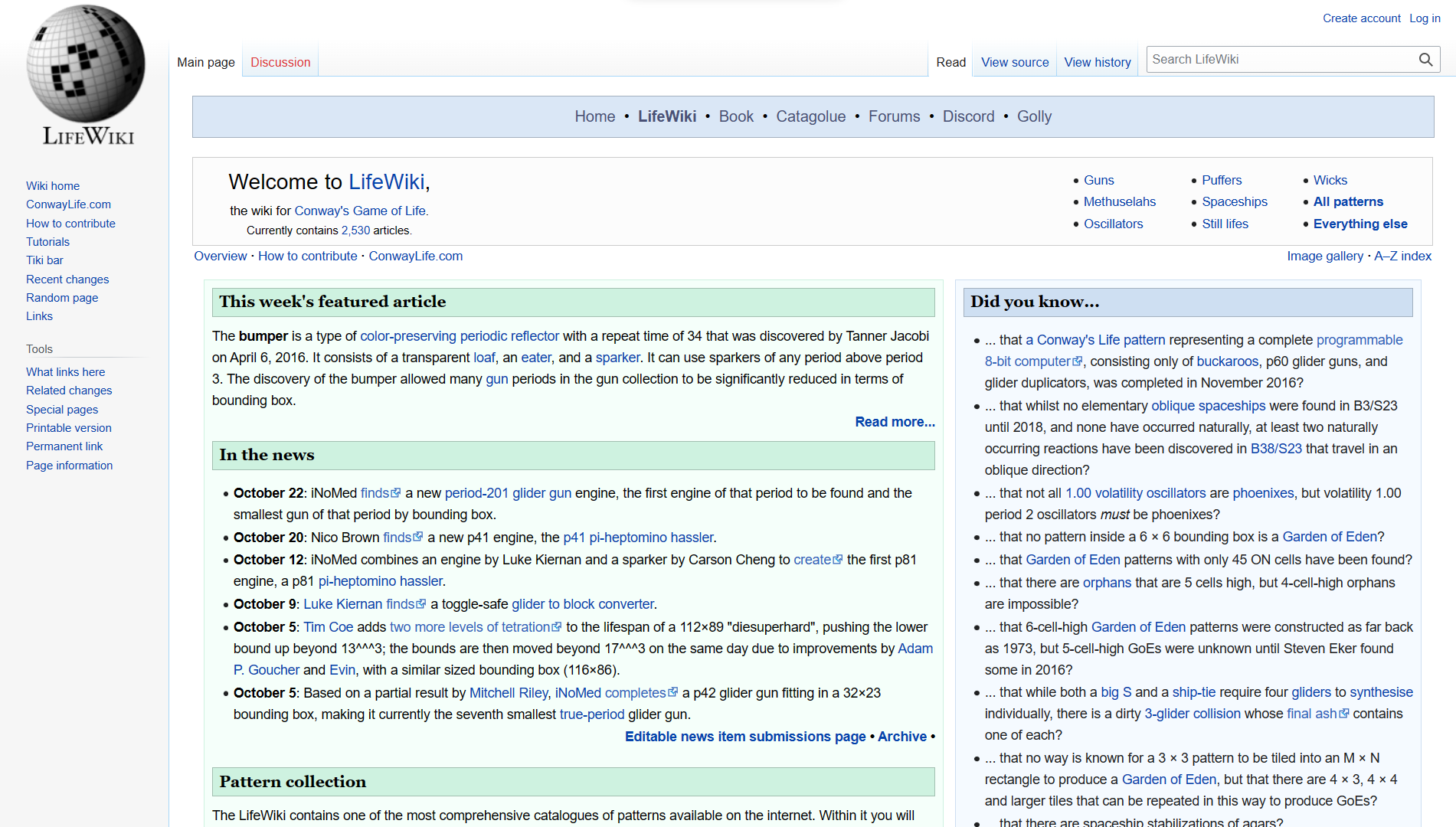
LifeWiki's homepage

LifeWiki is a wiki dedicated to Conway's Game of Life. It hosts over 2000 articles on the subject and a large collection of Life patterns stored in a format based on run-length encoding that it uses to interoperate with other Life software such as Golly.

LifeWiki was founded in 2009 by Nathaniel Johnston, a professor of mathematics and computer science at Mount Allison University, as part of the ConwayLife site founded in 2008 by Johnston. It serves as a focal point for one of the many mathematical communities John Horton Conway's work brought into being, a starting point for Life enthusiasts to learn about new developments in Life patterns, and a comprehensive listing of the many forms of emergent behavior that Life patterns are now known to have.
