= Replicator (cellular automaton) =

Type of pattern that infinitely produces copies of itself

The evolution of the replicator in Highlife.

In cellular automata, a replicator is a pattern that produces copies of itself.

In the one-dimensional Rule 90 cellular automaton, every pattern is a replicator. The same is true in the life-like cellular automaton rule Replicator (B1357/S1357).

Highlife (B36/S23) rule has a simple replicator.

On November 23, 2013, Dave Greene built the first replicator in Conway's Game of Life (B3/S23).
