= Speed of light (cellular automaton) =

Maximum rate at which information propagates in a cellular automaton grid

In Conway's Game of Life (and related cellular automata), the speed of light is a propagation rate across the grid of exactly one step (either horizontally, vertically or diagonally) per generation. In a single generation, a cell can only influence its nearest neighbours, and so the speed of light (by analogy with the speed of light in physics) is the maximum rate at which information can propagate. It is therefore an upper bound to the speed at which any pattern can move.

== Notation ==
As in physics, the speed of light is represented by the letter c. This in turn is used as a reference for describing the average propagation speed of any given type of spaceship. For example, a glider is said to have a speed of c/4, as it takes four generations for a given state to be translated by one cell. Similarly, the "lightweight spaceship" is said to have a speed of c/2, as it takes four generations for a given state to be translated by two cells.

== Lightspeed propagation ==
While c is an absolute upper bound to propagation speed, the maximum speed of a spaceship in Conway's Game of Life is c/2. This is because it is impossible to build a spaceship that can move every generation. (This is not true, though, for cellular automata in general; for instance, many light-speed spaceships exist in Seeds.) It is, however, possible for objects to travel at the speed of light if they move through a medium other than empty space. Such media include trails of hives, and alternating stripes of live and dead cells.

== Faster than light propagation ==
Certain patterns can appear to move at a speed greater than one cell per generation, but like faster than light phenomena in physics this is illusory.

An example is the "Star Gate", an arrangement of three converging gliders that will mutually annihilate on collision. If a lightweight spaceship (LWSS) hits the colliding gliders, it will appear to move forwards by 11 cells in only 6 generations, and thus travel faster than light. This illusion happens because the glider annihilation reaction proceeds by the creation and soon-after destruction of another LWSS. When the incoming LWSS hits the colliding gliders, it is not transported, but instead modifies the reaction so that the newly created LWSS can survive. The only signal being transmitted is determining whether the outgoing LWSS should survive or not. This does not need to reach its destination until after the LWSS has been "transported", so no information needs to travel faster than light.
