= Bounded growth =

Function increasing at a decreasing rate of increase

Bounded growth, also called asymptotic growth, occurs when the growth rate of a mathematical function is constantly increasing at a decreasing rate. Asymptotically, bounded growth approaches a fixed value. This contrasts with exponential growth, which is constantly increasing at an accelerating rate, and therefore approaches infinity in the limit.

Examples of bounded growth include the logistic function, the Gompertz function, and a simple modified exponential function like y = a + be^{gx}.

== See also ==
- Exponential growth
- Gompertz function
- Logistic function
