= Puffer train =

Cellular automaton pattern

In a cellular automaton, a puffer train, or simply puffer, is a finite pattern that moves itself across the "universe", leaving debris ("ash") behind. Thus a pattern consisting of only a puffer will grow arbitrarily large over time. While both puffers and spaceships have periods and speeds, unlike puffers, spaceships do not leave debris behind.

The period of a puffer can be considered as the combination of two periods; the first is the period of the puffer itself, while the second is the apparent period of the pattern of debris produced. This is often the same as the period of the puffer, but sometimes is a factor of the period. A puffer for which the apparent period deduced from the debris is smaller than the period of the engine is a pseudoperiod puffer. Such puffers are typically produced by artificial means. A true period puffer is one in which the period of the debris matches that of the puffer.

Puffers are divided into two classes, dirty puffers and clean puffers. While there is no precise distinction, a dirty puffer is one in which there is little apparent order in the debris (although the debris will still eventually be periodic). A clean puffer, conversely, has a small amount of debris that appears much more organized. A dirty puffer can sometimes be turned into a clean puffer by adding spaceships of the same velocity as the puffer that affect what debris results.

A puffer whose debris consists entirely of spaceships is called a rake.

== In Conway's Game of Life ==
Stable "dirty" puffer train

The first known puffer, in Conway's Game of Life, was discovered by Bill Gosper; it is a dirty puffer, but eventually stabilizes to leave a pattern of debris that repeats every 140 generations. Since then, many puffers have been discovered for this cellular automaton, with many different speeds and periods. Puffers are significant for Life and related rules for three reasons: First, if they can be stabilized in such a way that they produce only gliders (that is, turned into rakes) they can be used as part of many more complex patterns such as breeders. Second, stabilizations of puffers that eliminate all of their output debris can be used to produce spaceships with arbitrarily large periods. And third, puffers can sometimes be tamed or combined to form spaceships with speeds that do not seem to be achievable in other ways; for instance, in Life, the switch engine is a puffer train discovered by Charles Corderman that moves diagonally at speed c/12 (one cell every 12 generations on average), and in 1991 Dean Hickerson showed how to combine several switch engines to form a c/12 spaceship that he called the Cordership.
