= Bill Gosper =

American mathematician and programmer (born 1943)

Ralph William Gosper Jr.
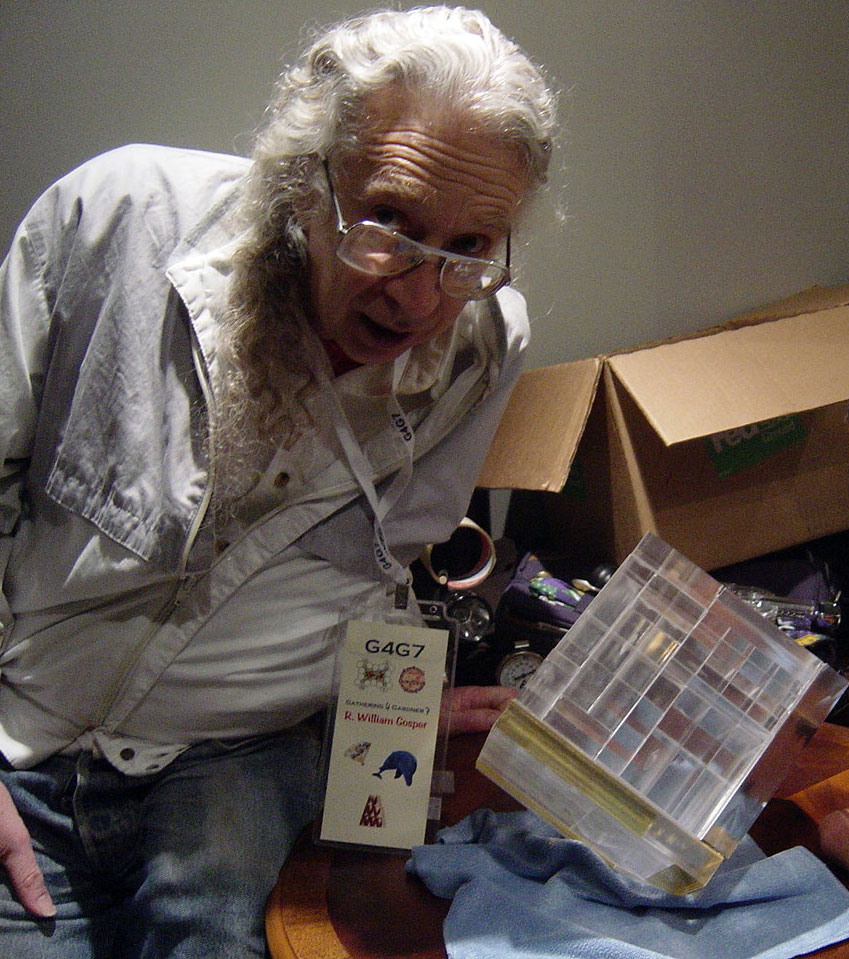
- Born: April 26, 1943 (age 83)
- Education: Massachusetts Institute of Technology
- Occupations: Programmer, Computer scientist, Mathematician
- Organizations: Xerox PARC, Symbolics, Wolfram Research, the Lawrence Livermore Laboratory, Macsyma, Inc.
- Known for: Gosper curve, Gosper Glider Gun, Gosper's algorithm, Hashlife

Ralph William Gosper Jr. (born April 26, 1943) is an American mathematician and programmer. Along with Richard Greenblatt, he may be considered to have founded the hacker community, and he holds a place of pride in the Lisp community. The Gosper curve and Gosper's algorithm are named after him.

== Becoming a hacker ==
In high school, Gosper was interested in model rockets until one of his friends was injured in a rocketry accident and contracted a fatal brain infection. Gosper enrolled in MIT in 1961, and he received his bachelor's degree in mathematics from MIT in 1965 despite becoming disaffected with the mathematics department because of their anti-computer attitude.

In his second year at MIT, Gosper took a programming course from John McCarthy and became affiliated with the MIT AI Lab.

His contributions to computational mathematics include HAKMEM and the MIT Maclisp system. He made major contributions to Macsyma, Project MAC's computer algebra system. Gosper later worked with Symbolics and Macsyma, Inc. on commercial versions of Macsyma.

In 1974, he moved to Stanford University, where he lectured, and worked with Donald Knuth.

Since that time, he has worked at or consulted for Xerox PARC, Symbolics, Wolfram Research, the Lawrence Livermore Laboratory, and Macsyma Inc.

== Key contributions ==
=== Conway's Game of Life ===
He became intensely interested in the Game of Life shortly after John Horton Conway had proposed it. Conway conjectured the existence of infinitely growing patterns, and offered a reward for an example. Gosper was the first to find such a pattern, the glider gun, and won the prize. Gosper was also the originator of the Hashlife algorithm that can speed up the computation of Life patterns by many orders of magnitude.

=== Packing problems ===
Gosper has created numerous packing problem puzzles, such as "Twubblesome Twelve".

=== Symbolic computation ===
Gosper was the first person to realize the possibilities of symbolic computation on a computer as a mathematics research tool, whereas computer methods were previously limited to purely numerical methods. In particular, this research resulted in his work on continued fraction representations of real numbers and Gosper's algorithm for finding closed form hypergeometric identities.

In 1985, Gosper briefly held the world record for computing the most digits of pi, with 17 million digits. See chronology of computation of π.

=== Space-filling curves ===
In the continuity of early 20th century examples of space-filling curves—the Koch-Peano curve, Cesàro and Lévy C curve, all special cases of the general de Rham curve—and following the path of Benoit Mandelbrot, Gosper discovered the Peano-Gosper curve, before engaging with variations on the Harter-Heighway dragon. In the late 80s, Gosper independently discovered the Gosper-Lafitte triangle.

== See also ==
- Hackers: Heroes of the Computer Revolution
- Hashlife
