= Golly (program) =

Cellular automata simulation software

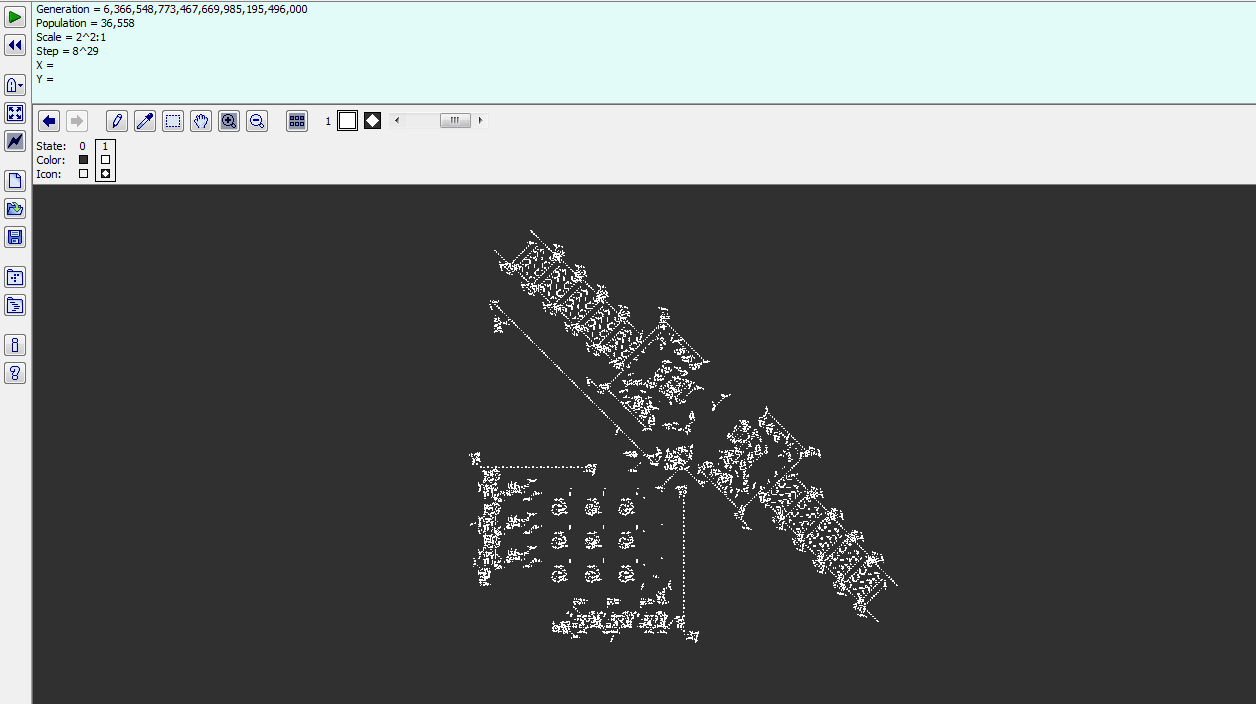
- Screenshot of Golly
- Original author: Andrew Trevorrow
- Developers: Andrew Trevorrow and Tom Rokicki
- Release: July 2005; 21 years ago
- Stable release: v5.1 / 15 November 2026; 2 days ago
- Preview release: v5.1b1 / October 21, 2026; 27 days ago
- Written in: C++ (wxWidgets)
- Operating system: Linux, FreeBSD, OpenBSD, Windows, OS X, iOS, Android
- License: GNU GPLv2
- Website: golly.sourceforge.io
- Repository: sourceforge.net/projects/golly/

Golly is a tool for the simulation of cellular automata. It is free open-source software written by Andrew Trevorrow and Tomas Rokicki; it can be scripted using Lua or Python. It includes a hashlife algorithm that can simulate the behavior of very large structured or repetitive patterns such as Paul Rendell's Life universal Turing machine, and that is fast enough to simulate some patterns for 2^{32} or more time units. It also includes a large library of predefined patterns in Conway's Game of Life and other rules.
