= Gun (cellular automaton) =

Cellular automaton pattern that emits spaceships

Gosper glider gun shooting gliders

In a cellular automaton, a gun is a pattern with a main part that repeats periodically, like an oscillator, and that also periodically emits spaceships. There are then two periods that may be considered: the period of the spaceship output, and the period of the gun itself, which is necessarily a multiple of the spaceship output's period. A gun whose period is larger than the period of the output is a pseudoperiod gun.

A gun and an "antigun" in the Life variation Day & Night

The first gun to be found in Conway's Game of Life was the Gosper glider gun

In the Game of Life, for every p greater than or equal to 14, it is possible to construct a glider gun in which the gliders are emitted with period p.

Since guns continually emit spaceships, the existence of guns in Life means that initial patterns with finite numbers of cells can eventually lead to configurations with limitless numbers of cells, something that John Conway himself originally conjectured to be impossible. However, according to Conway's later testimony, this conjecture was explicitly intended to encourage someone to disprove it – i.e., Conway hoped that infinite-growth patterns did exist.

Bill Gosper discovered the first glider gun in 1970, earning $50 from Conway. The discovery of the glider gun eventually led to the proof that Conway's Game of Life could function as a Turing machine. For many years this glider gun was the smallest one known in Life, although other rules had smaller guns.
