= Glider (Conway's Game of Life) =

Moving pattern in Conway's Game of Life

The mutation and movement of a "glider"

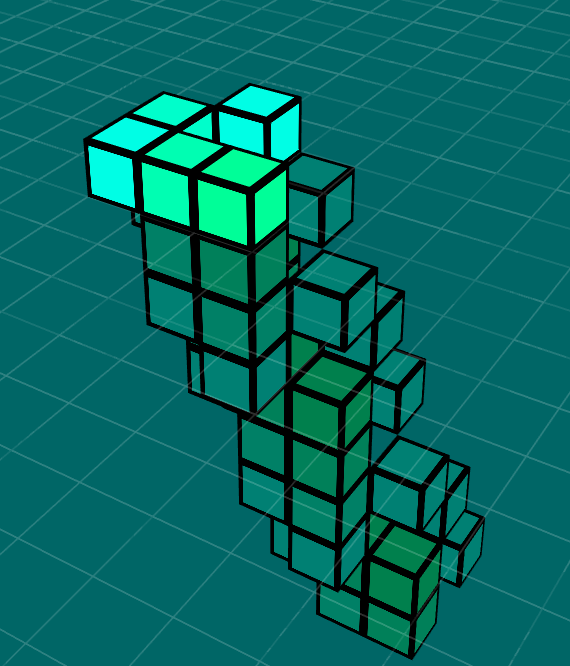
A three-dimensional view of a glider, with previous generations visible going down the z-axis. The c/4 period is clearly visible as "stacks" of cells that remain alive for successive generations.

The glider is a pattern that travels across the board in Conway's Game of Life. It was first discovered by Richard K. Guy in 1969, while John Conway's group was attempting to track the evolution of the R-pentomino. Gliders are the smallest spaceships, and they travel diagonally at a speed of one cell every four generations, or $c/4$. (Note: Sometimes referred to as c/4d, whereas c/4o is used for orthogonal movement.) The glider is often produced from randomly generated starting configurations.

The name comes from the fact that, after two steps, the glider pattern repeats its configuration with a glide reflection symmetry. After four steps and two glide reflections, it returns to its original orientation. John Conway remarked that he wished he had not called it the glider. The game was developed before the widespread use of interactive computers, and after seeing it animated, he felt the glider looks more like an ant walking across the plane.

== Importance ==
Gliders are important to the Game of Life because they are easily produced, can be collided with each other to form more complicated objects, and can be used to transmit information over long distances. Instances of this second advantage are called glider syntheses. For instance, eight gliders can be positioned so that they collide to form a Gosper glider gun. Glider collisions designed to result in certain patterns are also called glider syntheses. Patterns such as blocks, beehives, blinkers, traffic lights, even the uncommon Eater, can be synthesized with just two gliders. It takes three gliders to build the three other basic spaceships, and even the pentadecathlon oscillator.

Some patterns require a very large number (sometimes hundreds) of glider collisions; some oscillators, exotic spaceships, puffer trains, guns, etc. Whether the construction of an exotic pattern from gliders can possibly mean it can occur naturally is still a conjecture.

Gliders can also be collided with other patterns with interesting results. For example, if two gliders are shot at a block in just the right way, the block moves closer to the source of the gliders. If three gliders are shot in just the right way, the block moves farther away. This "sliding block memory" can be used to simulate a counter, which would be modified by firing gliders at it. It is possible to construct logic gates such as AND, OR and NOT using gliders. One may also build a pattern that acts like a finite-state machine connected to two counters. This has the same computational power as a universal Turing machine, so, using the glider, the Game of Life is theoretically as powerful as any computer with unlimited memory and no time constraints: it is Turing complete.

It was conjectured that any still life could be synthesized by gliders, with the details of the structure encoded by the positions and phases of the gliders. This has been disproven by a still life with 306 cells, constructed by Ilkka Törmä and Ville Salo in 2022, which can only be descended from itself without change. Also, anything that can be synthesized with gliders, can be synthesized with certain constructions called "universal constructors". There is a universal constructor that starts with only 15 gliders, with a construction algorithm published in 2022.

== Hacker emblem ==
The Glider in its usage as the hackers' emblem.

Eric S. Raymond has proposed the glider as an emblem to represent the hacker subculture, as the Game of Life appeals to hackers, and the concept of the glider was "born at almost the same time as the Internet and Unix". The emblem is in use in various places within the subculture.
