= Oscillator (cellular automaton) =

Type of pattern that returns to its original configuration after a number of steps

In a cellular automaton, an oscillator is a pattern that returns to its original state, in the same orientation and position, after a finite number of generations. Thus the evolution of such a pattern repeats itself indefinitely. Depending on context, the term may also include spaceships as well.

An oscillator is considered non-trivial if it contains at least one cell that oscillates at the necessary period. This means, for example, the mere juxtaposition of a period-17 oscillator and a period-4 oscillator is not a period-68 oscillator.

This article by default considers non-trivial oscillators in Conway's Game of Life, though this concept generalizes to all cellular automata.

The smallest number of generations it takes before the pattern returns to its initial condition is called the period of the oscillator. An oscillator with a period of 1 is usually called a still life, as such a pattern never changes. Sometimes, still lifes are not taken to be oscillators. Another common stipulation is that an oscillator must be finite.

== Types ==
Oscillators had been identified and named as early as 1971.

David Buckingham identified in 1996 a family of patterns named "Herschel conduits", with which one can construct arbitrary period n oscillators for every n ≥ 58, and true period n guns for every n ≥ 62. The discovery of the "Snark" by Mike Playle in April 2013 allowed the construction of oscillators of all periods n ≥ 43. It consisted of 4 "mirrors" for gliders, arranged in a rectangular loop, so that by simply enlarging the loop, oscillators of increasing periods could be made. Smaller than period-43 is impossible by this construction, since it would cause the 4 mirrors to interfere with each other.

The last remaining oscillator periods were constructed in 2023, proving Conway's Game of Life omniperiodic. A brief review of the history of oscillator constructions is in the paper.

== Examples ==
blinker, period 2

star, period 3

cross, period 3

French kiss, period 3

clock 2, period 4

pinwheel, period 4

octagon, period 5

fumarole, period 5

pentoad, period 5

Kok's galaxy, period 8

pentadecathlon, period 15
