= Spaceship (cellular automaton) =

Type of pattern that periodically changes position

Orthogonal spaceships in Conway's Game of Life of varying speeds (all which were known as of 2009, excluding the 17c/45 "caterpillar"). Note some spaceships “overtake” others due to speed differences.

In a cellular automaton, a finite pattern is called a spaceship if it reappears after a certain number of generations in the same orientation but in a different position. The smallest such number of generations is called the period of the spaceship.

== Description ==
The speed of a spaceship is often expressed in terms of c, the metaphorical speed of light (one cell per generation) which in many cellular automata is the fastest that an effect can spread. For example, a glider in Conway's Game of Life is said to have a speed of $c/4$, as it takes four generations for a given state to be translated by one cell. Similarly, the lightweight spaceship is said to have a speed of $c/2$, as it takes four generations for a given state to be translated by two cells. More generally, if a spaceship in a 2D automaton with the Moore neighborhood is translated by $(x, y)$ after $n$ generations, then the speed $v$ is defined as:

$v=\frac{\max\left(|x|,|y|\right)}{n}\,c$

This notation can be readily generalised to cellular automata with dimensionality other than two.

A pullalong is a pattern that is not a spaceship in itself but that can be attached to the back of a spaceship to form a larger spaceship. Similarly, a pushalong is placed at the front. The term tagalong can refer to either of these patterns or a pattern that can be placed at the side of a spaceship to form a larger spaceship.

A pattern that, when a spaceship is input, outputs a copy of the spaceship travelling in a different direction is called a reflector. If the output is instead a different spaceship, the pattern is known as a converter.

Spaceships are important because they can sometimes be modified to produce puffers. Spaceships can also be used to transmit information. For example, in Conway's Game of Life, the ability of the glider (Life's simplest spaceship) to transmit information is part of a proof that Life is Turing-complete.

In March 2016, the unexpected discovery of a small (Note: 6x12 bounding box, 28 cells at its smallest) but high-period (Note: c/10 orthogonal) spaceship enthused the Game of Life community. It was named "copperhead". A similar example, called "loafer", was found a few years earlier.

In March 2018, the first elementary spaceship with displacement (2,1) (knightwise) was discovered and named Sir Robin. The existence of spaceships that move at any rational slope (like Sir Robin) was proven in 1982 by Elwyn R. Berlekamp, but no example was ever found until Sir Robin's discovery.
