= Paterson's worms =

Family of cellular automata to model feeding behaviour

Paterson's worms are a family of cellular automata devised in 1971 by Mike Paterson and John Horton Conway to model the behaviour and feeding patterns of certain prehistoric worms. In the model, a worm moves between points on a triangular grid along line segments, representing food. Its turnings are determined by the configuration of eaten and uneaten line segments adjacent to the point at which the worm currently is. Despite being governed by simple rules the behaviour of the worms can be extremely complex, and the ultimate fate of one variant is still unknown.

The worms were studied in the early 1970s by Paterson, Conway and Michael Beeler, described by Beeler in June 1973, and presented in November 1973 in Martin Gardner's "Mathematical Games" column in Scientific American.

Electronic Arts' 1983 game Worms? is an interactive implementation of Paterson's worms, where each time a worm has to turn in a way that it lacks a rule for, it stops and lets the user choose a direction, which sets that rule for that worm.

== History ==
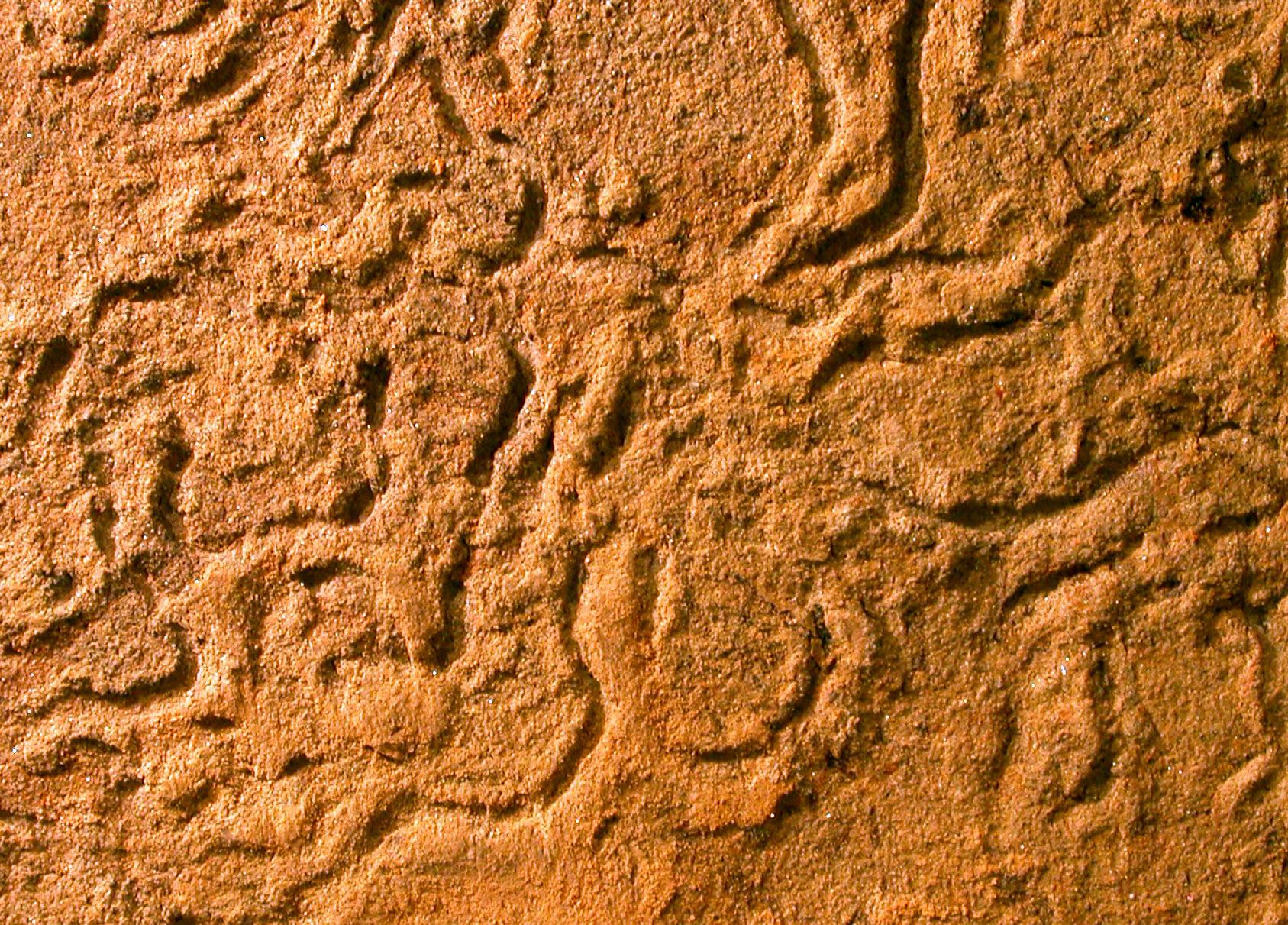
Fossilized worm tracks

Paterson's worms are an attempt to simulate the behaviour of prehistoric worms. These creatures fed upon sediment at the bottom of ponds and avoided retracing paths they had already travelled because food would be scarce there but, because food occurred in patches, it was in the worm's interest to stay near previous trails. Different species of worm had different innate rules regarding how close to travelled paths to stay, when to turn, and how sharp a turn to make. In 1969 Raup and Seilacher created computer simulations of the fossilized worm trails, and these simulations inspired Paterson and Conway to develop a simple set of rules to study idealized worms on regular grids.

Conway's original model was a worm on an orthogonal grid but this produced only three different species of worm, all with rather uninteresting behaviour. Paterson considered worms on a triangular grid. Paterson's worms were described by Beeler in a Massachusetts Institute of Technology AI Memo (#) and were presented in November 1973 in Martin Gardner's "Mathematical Games" column in Scientific American, and later reprinted in Gardner 1986. These simulations differed in approach from other cellular automata developed around the same time, which focused on cells and the relationships between them. Simple computer models such as these are too abstract to accurately describe the behaviour of the real creatures, but they do demonstrate that even very simple rules can give rise to patterns resembling their tracks.

== Rules ==
The worm starts at some point of an infinite triangular grid. It starts moving along one of the six gridlines that meet at each point and, once it has travelled one unit of distance, it arrives at a new point. The worm then decides, based on the distribution of traversed and untraversed gridlines, what direction it will take. The directions are relative to the worm's point of view. If the worm has not encountered this exact distribution before it may leave along any untraversed gridline. From then on, if it encounters that distribution again, it must move in the same way. If there are no untraversed gridlines available, the worm dies and the simulation ends.

== Discussion ==
There are many different types of worm depending on which direction they turn when encountering a new type of intersection. The different varieties of worm can be classified systematically by assigning every direction a number and listing the choice made every time a new type of intersection is encountered.

The six directions are numbered as follows, where 3 is the direction the worm has just arrived from:

Direction 0 indicates the worm continues to travel straight ahead, direction 1 indicates the worm will make a right turn of 60° and similarly for the other directions. The worm cannot travel in direction 3. Thus a worm with rule {1,0,5,1} decides to travel in direction 1 the first time it has to make a choice, in direction 0 the next time it has to make a choice and so on. If there is only one available gridline, the worm has no choice but to take it and this is usually not explicitly listed.

Paterson's worm with rule { 2, 0, 0 }

A worm whose ruleset begins with 0 continues in a straight line forever. This is a trivial case, so it is usually stipulated that the worm must turn when it encounters a point with only uneaten gridlines. Furthermore, to avoid mirror-image symmetrical duplicates, the worm's first turn must be a right hand turn. A worm dies if it returns to its origin a third time, because there are then no untraversed edges available. Only the origin can be lethal to the worm.

There are 1,296 possible combinations of worm rules. This can be seen by the following argument:

1. If the worm encounters a node with no eaten segments, other than the one it has just eaten, it can either make a sharp turn or a gentle one. Since the initial choice of left or right produces combinations that are simply mirrors of each other, they are not effectively different.
2. If it encounters a node with one eaten segment, it can leave along any of the remaining four. Only the worm's first return to the origin has this character.
3. For two eaten segments, the location of the eaten segments is important. The only type of two-segment intersections that can exist is that produced by the first rule, for which there are four distinct approach directions, each of which offers a choice of three departure directions. This allows for 81 different alternatives in choosing rules.
4. If the worm returns to the origin, it will encounter three eaten segments and must choose between the two remaining uneaten ones regardless of their distribution.
5. For four eaten segments, there is only one uneaten segment left and the worm must take it.

There are therefore 2×4×81×2×1=1,296 different combinations of rules. Many of these are mirror-image duplicates of others, and others die before having to make all the choices in their ruleset, leaving 411 distinct species (412 if the infinite straight-line worm is included). 336 of these species eventually die. 73 patterns exhibit infinite behaviour, that is, they settle into a repeating pattern that does not return to the origin. A further two are strongly believed to be infinite and one remains unsolved. Eleven of the rules exhibit complicated behaviour. They do not die even after many billions of iterations, nor do they adopt an obviously infinite pattern. Their ultimate fate was unknown until 2003 when Benjamin Chaffin developed new methods of solving them. After many hours of computer time, nine of the eleven rules were solved, leaving the worms with rules {1,0,4,2,0,2,0} and {1,0,4,2,0,1,5}. The first of these was solved by Tomas Rokicki, who determined that it halts after 57 trillion (5.7×10^{13}) timesteps, leaving only {1,0,4,2,0,1,5} unsolved. According to Rokicki, the worm is still active after 5.2×10^{19} timesteps. He used an algorithm based on Bill Gosper's Hashlife to simulate the worms at extraordinary speeds. This behaviour is considerably more complex than the related rectangular grid worm, which has a longest path of only 16 segments.

It is possible for two different species of worm to produce the same path, though they do not necessarily traverse it in the same order. The most common path is also the shortest: the seven point MOT test/fallout shelter symbol. One example of this path is shown in the animated figure above. In total there are 299 different paths, and 209 of these are produced by just one species.

== See also ==
- Busy beaver – Concept in theoretical computer science
- Langton's ant – Two-dimensional Turing machine with emergent behavior
- Turing machine – Computation model defining an abstract machine
- Turmite – Turing machine on a two-dimensional grid
