= David Linden =

David Linden may refer to:

- David Linden (politician) (born 1990), Scottish politician
- David J. Linden (born 1961), American neuroscientist
