= Worms? =

1983 video game

- EA "album cover" box
- Developer: Electronic Arts
- Publishers: NA: Electronic Arts; EU: Ariolasoft
- Producer: Susan W. Lee-Merrow
- Designer: David Maynard
- Platforms: Commodore 64, Atari 8-bit
- Release: C64: October 1983; Atari 8-bit: November 1983
- Genre: Puzzle
- Mode: Single-player

Worms? is a puzzle video game written by David Maynard for Atari 8-bit computers and ported to the Commodore 64. It was released in 1983 as one of the first publications from Electronic Arts. Worms? is an interactive version of Paterson's Worms.

Maynard later worked on the 8-bit word processor from Electronic Arts, Cut & Paste. On March 17, 2021, the source code of Worms? was published with the MIT License.

== Gameplay ==
The game is abstract, like Conway's Game of Life. However, the player's ostensible goal is to optimally program one or more worms (each a sort of cellular automaton) to grow and survive as long as possible. The game area is divided up into hexagonal cells, and the worms are programmed to move in a particular direction for each combination of filled-in and empty frame segments in their immediate vicinity. The player needs to give the worm progressively less input, and more moves by the worm results in a familiar situation for which the worm has already been trained. As the worms move, they generate aleatoric music.

== Development ==
David Maynard developed the game for his Atari 800 in the fig-Forth variant of the Forth programming language and using the book De Re Atari to understand the hardware. When he finished the game, in late 1982, it was titled Sumo Worms. After Epyx declined to publish it, Worms? was accepted by Electronic Arts, who also hired him as one of the company's first two engineers and eleventh employee overall.

== Reception ==
Allen Doum reviewed the game for Computer Gaming World, stating that "Worms? can be played competitively, either by teams or individuals or can be used solitaire as a pattern drawing puzzle. Its sound and graphics are excellent, and some of the graphics elements and the speed of the game can be varied." Orson Scott Card in Compute! gave complimentary reviews to the EA games Worms?, M.U.L.E., and Archon: The Light and the Dark. He said of the trio that "they are original; they do what they set out to do very, very well; they allow the player to take part in the creativity; they do things that only computers can do". William Michael Brown for Electronic Fun with Computers & Games praised its originality and rated it 3 out of 4, because he said it is not for everyone.

Leo Laporte wrote in Hi-Res said that Worms? was "Very nice, very pretty, very boring [...] I've been playing with this program for two weeks. It hasn't gotten any more interesting". Compute!'s Gazette's reviewer called Worms? for the Commodore 64 "one of the most fascinating games I've played in a long time. It's so different from anything else that it quickly captivated me. Worms? tournaments become popular among the staff of Compute! ... [It] is as much fun to watch as it is to play". He added that part of its appeal was that "The game is hard to master. It's easy to play, but seems almost impossible to play well time after time".

In May 1988, Compute! listed it as one of "Our Favorite Games", writing that four years after its introduction "Worms? is still in a class by itself [requiring] a sense of strategy as well as proficiency at joystick maneuvers".

== Legacy ==
In August 2019, Maynard launched a variant of the Worms? concept as the browser game DARWORMS.
