= Cut & Paste =

1984 word processor

- Original authors: Steve Hayes; Tim Mott; Jerry Morrison; Dan Silva; Steve Shaw; David S. Maynard; Norm Lane
- Developer: Electronic Arts
- Release: 1984; 42 years ago
- Platform: Apple II, Atari 8-bit, Commodore 64, IBM PC, PCjr
- Type: Word processor
- License: Proprietary software

Cut & Paste is a word processor published in 1984 for the Apple II, Atari 8-bit computers, Commodore 64, IBM PC compatibles, and IBM PCjr. It is one of the few productivity releases from game developer and publisher Electronic Arts, along with the contemporaneous Financial Cookbook. In the UK it was distributed by Ariolasoft.

Originally sold for US$50, Cut & Paste was praised for its user-friendliness and criticized as overly simplistic. Magazine advertisements proclaimed, "If you can learn to use this word processor in 90 seconds, can it really be any good?" and the slogan on the box read "The Remarkably Simple Word Processor".

== Overview ==
Cut & Paste is a simple word processor released by Electronic Arts in 1984 for $50 (equivalent to $155 in 2025). It was developed in a time when the ability to cut, copy, and paste text (now known as a clipboard) was a significant feature for home computers. Its package is a hard plastic box which opens like a book, containing a program floppy disk, a data floppy disk with sample documents, and a 27-page manual including the operation of all four supported computers.

The application launches with onscreen instructions. Ongoing usage has a fullscreen text editor with a one-row menu bar along the bottom. The menu bar is accessed using the esc key, and is navigated with the arrow keys and return key. The application operates in insert mode, so existing characters are edited only by deleting instead of typing directly over them. Backspace from the right is used instead of delete from the left. The application can help prevent the orphaning of a paragraph's line across a page break. There is a full-screen print menu. The application's namesake feature allows the user to begin a selection, use the arrow keys to mark the full selection, and end a selection—then cut it and paste it. The clipboard buffer persists between different documents.

Features absent from Cut & Paste which were sooner or later considered staples of 1980s word processing include saving the page headers, right margin justification, centering, underlining, selecting fonts, utilizing any printer features, text searching, spelling checking, and paragraph lead indentation. It uses a proprietary file format which can't be interchanged with any other software. The IBM PC version is a self-booting disk, so it cannot be installed onto a hard disk and users cannot format data disks outside the application.

== Development ==
Cut & Paste was developed by Steve Hayes, Tim Mott, Jerry Morrison, Dan Silva, Steve Shaw, David S. Maynard, and Norm Lane. David Maynard had previously created Worms?, a software toy that was one of the 1983 launch titles from Electronic Arts. Dan Silva went on to write Deluxe Paint for the Amiga, published in 1985.

== Reception ==
Marty Petersen, for InfoWorld, wrote "We think it is simply mediocre, performing just adequately, and not nearly as good a buy as some other low-cost word processing programs." He called out the limited text formatting capabilities as a significant drawback, and concluded that Cut & Paste is "little more than a glorified typewriter". Arthur Leyenberger in August 1984 for ANALOG Computing wrote of the Atari 8-bit version, "The user interface is probably Cut & Paste's strongest feature. [...] I was able to start typing this review using the program as soon as I put the disk in the drive." But he found the software "just does not have enough features to make it a serious choice for anyone doing more than writing an occasional letter". BYTE said that Cut & Paste "is simple to use, but unfortunately it's much too limited to be of great value as a serious word processor", recommending it for children learning how to use a computer. Reviewing the Atari 8-bit version for Page 6 in 1986, John Davison concluded, "I find it difficult to raise any enthusiasm for this program. Its few good points are far outweighed by its many bad ones. In action, it seems closer to an electronic typewriter than a computerised word processor."

PC Magazine approved of the IBM PC version of Cut & Paste's $14.95 price and ease of use, but said that beyond the ability to cut and paste text "the list of what can't be done with this program is considerably longer". The magazine cited the greatest limitation being "the program exists in a vacuum": the custom disk format for files prevents interoperability with other tools and MS-DOS in general.
