= Greg Turk =

American academic (born 1961)

- Born: July 21, 1961 (age 65); Durham, NC
- Citizenship: United States
- Education: University of California, Los Angeles
- Known for: Stanford bunny
- Awards: Technical Paper Chair, SIGGRAPH 2008, ACM Computer Graphics Achievement Award 2012
- Scientific career
- Fields: Computer graphics
- Workplaces: Georgia Institute of Technology

Greg Turk is an American-born researcher in the field of computer graphics and a professor at the School of Interactive Computing in the College of Computing at the Georgia Institute of Technology (Georgia Tech). His paper "Zippered polygon meshes from range images", concerning the reconstruction of surfaces from point data, brought the "Stanford bunny", a frequently used example object in computer graphics research, into the CGI lexicon. Turk actually purchased the original Stanford Bunny and performed the initial scans on it. He is also known for his work on simplification of surfaces, and on reaction–diffusion-based texture synthesis. In 2008, Turk was the technical papers chair of SIGGRAPH 2008. In 2012, Greg Turk was awarded the ACM Computer Graphics Achievement Award 2012.

== Education and computer graphics research ==
After receiving his Ph.D. from the University of North Carolina at Chapel Hill under the supervision of Henry Fuchs in 1992, Turk was a postdoctoral researcher at Stanford University from 1992 to 1994 with Marc Levoy before he returned to UNC-Chapel Hill as a research professor from 1994 to 1996. He joined the Georgia Tech faculty in 1996. The following year, Turk was awarded an NSF CAREER Award, one of the most prestigious awards granted by the NSF to new faculty.

It was while at Stanford that he first brought the "Stanford bunny" back to the lab for scanning, which he recounts in a "had I but known" fashion:

"One day, close to . . . Easter . . . I was out shopping on University Avenue near the Stanford campus. . . . . On one of the shelves of [a] store was a large collection of clay bunny rabbits, all identical. I had range scanning on my mind, and these bunnies looked to be about the right shape and size for our . . . project. Even better, these bunnies were made of terra cotta (red clay), so they were red and diffuse. I bought one of these bunnies. Had I known how popular the digital model would become, I would have bought many! I brought this clay bunny back to the Stanford Graphics Lab and scanned it from several directions. Using the methods that Marc and I [had] developed, I aligned a collection of ten such range scans to one another and merged them into a single polygonal mesh. The resulting model has come to be known as the Stanford Bunny. The original bunny still lives at Stanford."

== Personal life ==
Turk was born in 1961, and grew up in Southern California. He attended Santa Monica High School in the 1970s, where he was a member of the nonmusical group "The Olive Starlight Orchestra", along with David Linden, Keith Goldfarb, David Coons, Susan P. Crawford, Eric Enderton and Jan Steckel. He did his undergraduate work at UCLA.

A guitarist in a short-lived band while he attended UCLA, Turk performed with the group as "Industrial Waist", which also had Jack Watt (on drums; formerly Jackie Watt before he transitioned), the mathematician and teacher Paul Lockhart (lead vocals, guitar; Lockhart later became known for writing the internet sensation, and later book, A Mathematician's Lament), the Rhythm and Hues Studios co-founder Keith Goldfarb (bass guitar player), and Alex Melnick (the band's original drummer). Turk and Lockhart were roommates in Santa Monica for a couple of years while they attended UCLA.

Turk lives in Atlanta.

== Notable publications ==
Citations taken from his Google Scholar Profile (May 2014).

- Turk G, Levoy M. (1994) "Zippered polygon meshes from range images" cited: 1254
- Turk G (1992) "Re-tiling polygonal surfaces" cited: 1038
- Turk G (1991) "Generating textures on arbitrary surfaces using reaction–diffusion" cited: 517

== See also ==
- Turmites
