= David J. Linden =

American neuroscientist

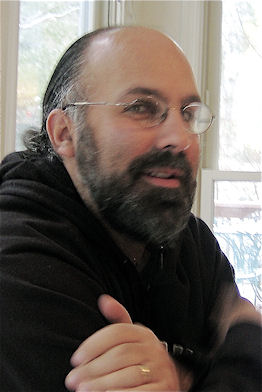
- Born: 1961 (age 64–65)
- Education: University of California, Berkeley
- Awards: Silver Medal, Science, Independent Publisher Association
- Scientific career
- Workplaces: Johns Hopkins University

David J. Linden (born November 3, 1961) is an American professor of neuroscience at Johns Hopkins University in Baltimore, Maryland, and the author of The Accidental Mind: How Brain Evolution Has Given Us Love, Memory, Dreams, and God. The book The Accidental Mind is an attempt to explain the human brain to intelligent lay readers, and recently received a silver medal in the category of Science from the Independent Publisher Association. As of July 1, 2008, he has been the editor-in-chief of the Journal of Neurophysiology. Linden's second book, The Compass of Pleasure: How Our Brains Make Fatty Foods, Orgasm, Exercise, Marijuana, Generosity, Vodka, Learning, and Gambling Feel So Good, was released on April 14, 2011 (ISBN 978-0670022588).

In addition to Linden's academic research, he is known as a popularizer of brain science, often making biochemistry understandable to non-science majors in his numerous appearances on the radio and on college campuses.

== Brain chemistry and neuroscience ==
Most of Linden's undergraduate work was performed at University of California, Berkeley; his graduate work took place at Northwestern University in Evanston, Illinois. He also worked briefly at Hoffmann-La Roche, in Nutley, New Jersey, after receiving his doctorate. The aspect of his work that appeals to "lay people" is becoming increasingly popular, which has led to appearances around the country in which he discusses quirky facts about brain chemistry, and grants interviews on neuroscience. At a recent talk for freshmen at a liberal arts college, he proclaimed I had no idea my book would become required reading for 500 freshmen. I'm so sorry; I feel like those guys who worked on the Manhattan Project.

Newsweek ran an extensive summary of The Accidental Mind in 2007 by Sharon Begley that summarized his conclusions:

To [David Linden], the brain is a 'cobbled-together mess.' Impressive in function, sure. But in its design the brain is 'quirky, inefficient and bizarre ... a weird agglomeration of ad hoc solutions that have accumulated throughout millions of years of evolutionary history.' ... More than another salvo in the battle over whether biological structures are the products of supernatural design or biological evolution ... research on our brain's primitive foundation is cracking such puzzles as why we cannot tickle ourselves, why we are driven to spin narratives even in our dreams, and why reptilian traits persist in our gray matter.

In the spring of 2007 the online magazine Slate ran a roundup of interviews with the nation's top popularizers of brain science in which Linden declared, somewhat facetiously:

One area of social cognition wherein humans really excel is knowing the precise direction of another's gaze. In practical terms, this means that if you're at a conference and you try to surreptitiously flick your eyes to a colleague's name badge (or her breasts), you'll get busted every time. This knowledge should prevent me from trying to get away with these behaviors, but it doesn't."

== Personal life ==
Born in 1961, Linden grew up in Santa Monica, California; his late father was a well-regarded psychiatrist in Los Angeles with a celebrity clientele; his mother, now retired, was an editor of (and proofreader for) textbook publishers.

Linden attended Santa Monica High School, where he was sometimes associated with a crowd that called itself "The Olive Starlight Orchestra," or "The Olives" for short (the group had nothing to do with music). He knew people like Sandra Tsing Loh, Daphne Nugent, Jan Steckel, film editor Kate Sanford, internet activist Susan P. Crawford, mathematician and teacher Paul Lockhart, entrepreneur Keith Goldfarb (co-founder of Rhythm and Hues), computer-graphics researcher Greg Turk, and speculative fiction writer Janine Ellen Young. The Olives were loosely affiliated with Tsing Loh's organization at Samohi, "The Young Bureaucrats, Of Course" (YBOC), and were referred to by conservative blogger Joy McCann as "the late 20th Century's Bloomsbury Group."

Linden is an amateur photographer, and has held a few private exhibitions, including one that featured pictures of house paint, and one in the 1990s that concentrated on images of neon signage.

Linden now lives in Baltimore with his daughter and son.

On December 30, 2021, David announced that he was recently diagnosed with terminal cancer in an article in the Atlantic titled "A Neuroscientist Prepares for Death."

== Writings ==
The Web of Science lists 87 articles in peer-reviewed journals for Linden, which have been cited over 6000 times, giving him an h-index of over 40.

Books

- Linden, D. (2020). Unique: The New Science of Human Individuality. Basic Books.

- Linden, D. J. (2018). Think Tank: Forty Neuroscientists Explore the Biological Roots of Human Experience. Yale University Press.

- David J. Linden (2015). Touch: The Science of Hand, Heart, and Mind. New York, NY: Viking Press. ISBN 978-0-670-01487-3.
- David J. Linden (2011). Pleasure. Oxford, England: Oneworld Publications. ISBN 978-1-85168-824-1.
- David Linden (2007). The Accidental Mind: How Brain Evolution Has Given Us Love, Memory, Dreams, and God. Cambridge, MA: Belknap Press of Harvard University Press. ISBN 978-0-674-02478-6.
- David Linden (2003). "From Molecules to Memory in the Cerebellum". Science. 301 (5640): 1682–5. doi:10.1126/science.1090462. PMID 14500971. S2CID 94437442.
- David Linden, Joane Trestrail (May 1986). "Neon Lights up the Night". Chicago Magazine.

Linden was also featured in a tribute to children's literature entitled Everything I Need To Know I Learned from a Children's Book, compiled by Anita Silvey and published in 2009; his contribution was an ode to Homer Price.
