= A Mathematician's Lament =

Short book on mathematics education

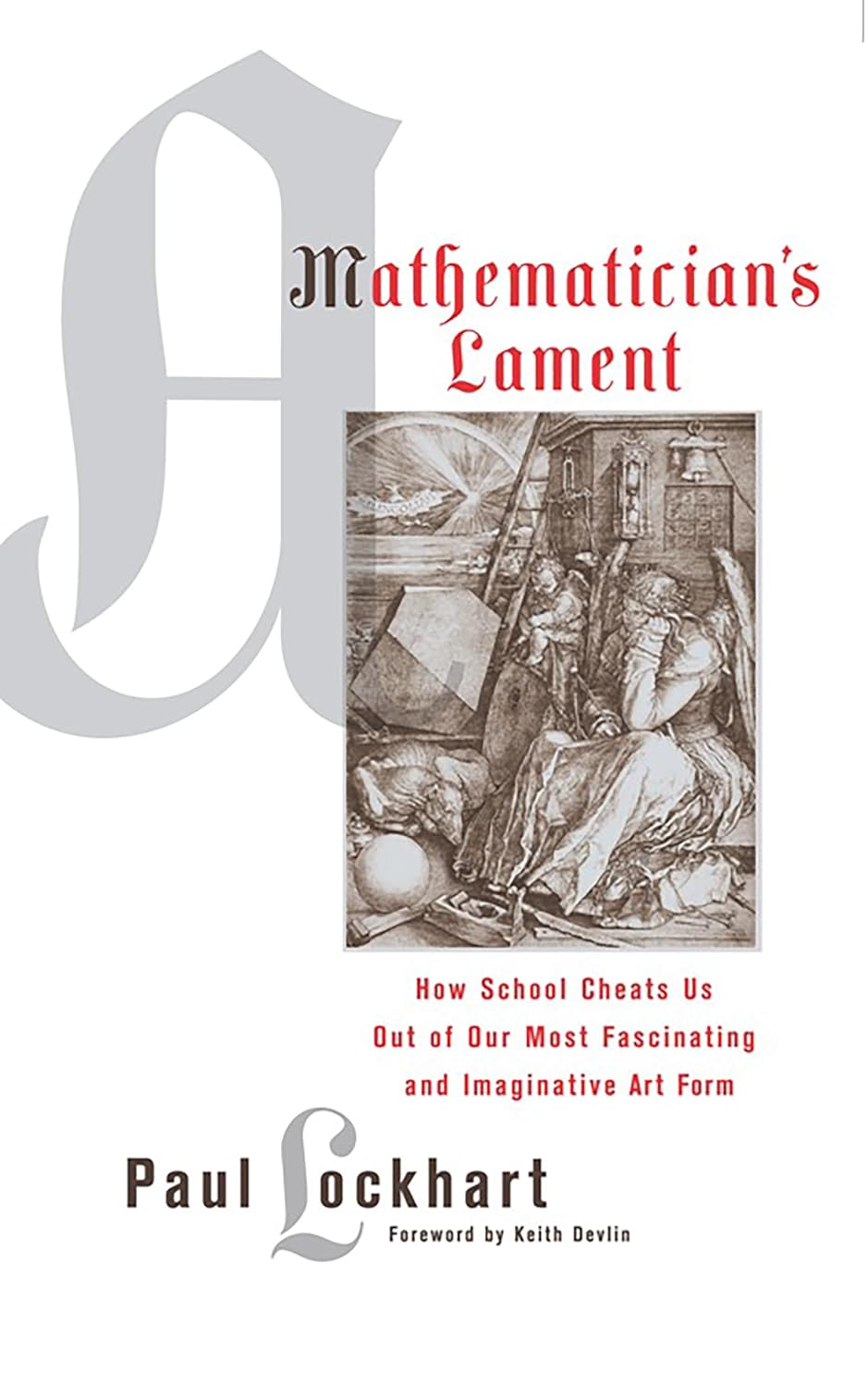
- Front cover
- Author: Paul Lockhart
- Language: English
- Genre: Philosophy, Mathematics
- Published: 2009 Bellevue Literary Press
- Publication place: United States
- Media type: Print (paperback)
- Pages: 140
- ISBN: 978-1-934137-17-8

A Mathematician's Lament, often referred to informally as Lockhart's Lament, is a short book on mathematics education by Paul Lockhart, originally a research mathematician at Brown University and U.C. Santa Cruz, and subsequently a math teacher at Saint Ann's School in Brooklyn, New York City for many years. This strongly worded opinion piece is organized into two parts. The first part, "Lamentation", criticizes the way mathematics is typically taught in American schools and argues for an aesthetic, intuitive, and problem-oriented approach to teaching. The second part, "Exultation", gives specific examples of how to teach mathematics as an art.

== Background ==
This book was developed from a 25-page essay that was written in 2002, originally circulated in typewritten manuscript copies, and subsequently published by Keith Devlin on his online column for the Mathematical Association of America's webzine MAA Online.

Lockhart has since written Measurement (2012), Arithmetic (2017), and The Mending of Broken Bones (2025).

== Summary ==
In the first part, “Lamentation”, Lockhart emphasizes mathematics as an art. He criticizes mathematics education for prioritizing rote memorization and notation, which he argues is of little interest to the average student. Lockhart pushes instead for a focus on mathematical proofs and showcasing the beauty in mathematics, absent of any application. He also criticizes the use of two-column proofs in the teaching of geometry for obscuring this beauty and misrepresenting how mathematicians create proofs.

In the second part, “Exultation”, Lockhart gives specific examples from number theory, geometry, and graph theory to argue that math primarily arises from play. He argues that this play should be the primary focus of mathematics education.

== Reception ==
Daniel Farlow and William Schmidt, writing in Math Horizons and Notices of the American Mathematical Society, respectively, praised Lockhart's criticisms of mathematics education. Schmidt, however, also criticized Lockhart's proposed approach to math education for exacerbating preexisting inequalities within the education system. Timo Tossavainen, writing in The Mathematical Intelligencer, criticized Lockhart for "overlook[ing] what is realistically possible in mathematics teachers’ education", but he ultimately praised the book as a "necessary reminder of how all is lost if the joy of doing mathematics and the students’ right to experience it are not at the heart of mathematics education."
