= Ed Pegg Jr. =

American mathematician

Edward Taylor Pegg Jr.
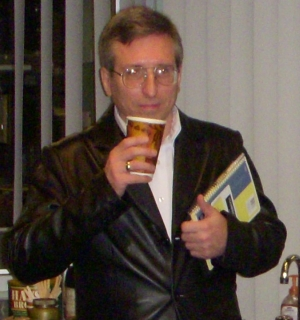
- Born: December 7, 1963 (age 62); Denver, Colorado, U.S.
- Education: University of Colorado at Colorado Springs
- Occupation: Mathematician
- Writing career
- Genres: Mathematical puzzles, Mathematical recreation
- Website: mathpuzzle.com

Edward Taylor Pegg Jr. (born December 7, 1963) is an expert on mathematical puzzles and is a self-described recreational mathematician. He wrote an online puzzle column called Ed Pegg Jr.'s Math Games for the Mathematical Association of America during the years 2003–2007. His puzzles have also been used by Will Shortz on the puzzle segment of NPR's Weekend Edition Sunday. He was a fan of Martin Gardner and regularly participated in Gathering 4 Gardner conferences. In 2009, he teamed up with Tom M. Rodgers and Alan Schoen to edit two Gardner tribute books.

Pegg received a master's degree in mathematics from the University of Colorado at Colorado Springs, writing his thesis on the subject of fair dice. In 2000, he left NORAD to join Wolfram Research, where he collaborated on A New Kind of Science (NKS). In 2004, he started assisting Eric W. Weisstein at Wolfram MathWorld. He has made contributions to several hundred MathWorld articles. He was one of the chief consultants for Numb3rs.
