= Science and technology in Venezuela =

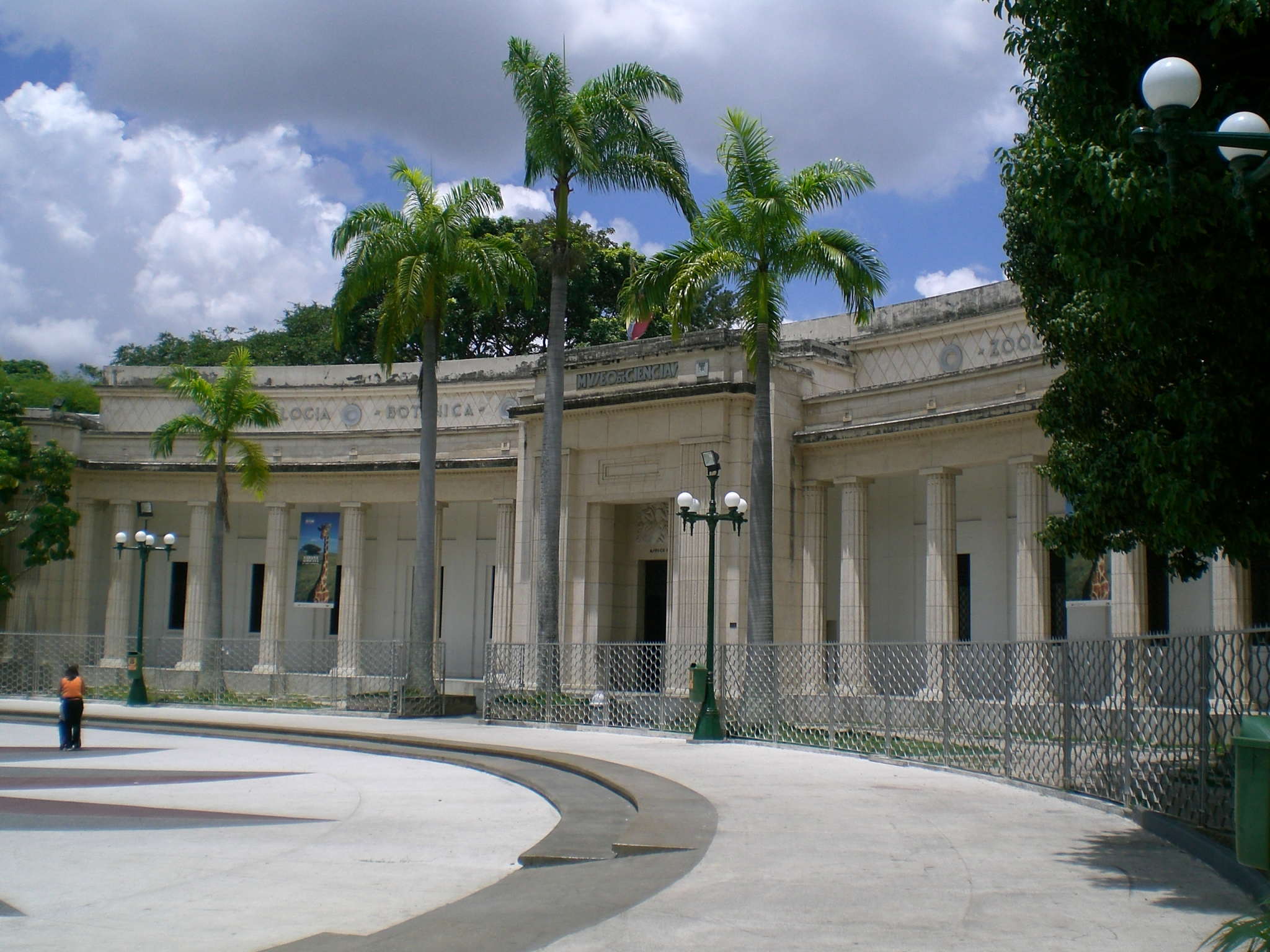
Museo de Ciencias de Caracas

Science and technology in Venezuela includes research based on exploring Venezuela's diverse ecology and the lives of its indigenous peoples.

Under the Spanish rule, the monarchy made very little effort to promote education in the American colonies and in particular in those in which they had less commercial interest, as in Venezuela. The country only had its first university some two hundred years later than Mexico, Colombia or Panama.

The first studies on the native languages of Venezuela and the indigenous customs were made in the middle of the XVIII century by the Catholic missionaries. The Jesuits Joseph Gumilla and Filippo Salvatore Gilii were the first to theorize about linguistic relations and propose possible language families for the Orinoco river basin. The Swedish botanist Pehr Löfling, one of the 12 Apostles of Carl Linnaeus, classificated for the first time the exuberant tropical flora of the Orinoco river basin. Other naturalists in the last decade of the siecle were Nikolaus Joseph von Jacquin, Alexander Humboldt and Aimé Bonpland.

In the nineteenth century, several scientists visited Venezuela such as Francisco Javier de Balmis, Agostino Codazzi, Jean-Baptiste Boussingault, Mariano Eduardo de Rivero y Ustáriz, Jean Joseph D'Auxion de La Vayesse, François de Pons, José Salvany, Auguste Sallé, Robert Hermann Schomburgk, Wilhelm Sievers, Carl Ferdinand Appun, Custav Karsten, Adolf Ernst, Édouard André, Benedikt Roezl, Karl Moritz, Friedrich Gerstäcker, Anton Goering, Johann Gottlieb Benjamin Siegert, Augustus Fendler, Federico Johow, Charles Waterton, Alfred Russel Wallace, Everard im Thurn, François Désiré Roulin, Henry Whitely, Jean Chaffanjon, Frank M. Chapman, Émile-Arthur Thouar, Jules Crevaux and many others, some of whom are buried in Venezuela.

The Venezuelan Institute for Scientific Research (IVIC) founded on February 9, 1959, by government decree, has its origins in the Venezuelan Institute of Neurology and Brain Research (IVNIC) which Dr. Humberto Fernandez Moran founded in 1955.

Other major research institutions include the Central University of Venezuela and the University of the Andes, Venezuela.

Notable Venezuelan scientists include nineteenth century physician José María Vargas, the chemist Vicente Marcano and the botanist and geographer Alfredo Jahn (1867–1940). More recently, Baruj Benacerraf shared the 1980 Nobel Prize in Physiology or Medicine, Augusto Pi Suñer (1955), Aristides Bastidas (1980), Marcel Roche (1987) and Marisela Salvatierra (2002) have been recipients of UNESCO's Kalinga Prize for promotion of the public understanding of science. On July 2, 2012, L. Rafael Reif – a Venezuelan American electrical engineer, inventor and academic administrator – was elected president of the Massachusetts Institute of Technology.

== Biology ==
=== Ecology ===
Pehr Löfling (Tolvfors Bruk, Gävle, Sweden, January 31, 1729 – San Antonio del Caroni (Guayana, Venezuela), February 22, 1756). Swedish botanist who studied at the University of Uppsala where he attended courses taught by Carl Linnaeus. When the Spanish ambassador at Stockholm asked Linnaeus to select a botanist for service in the American colonies, the professor at once named Loefling. He went to Spain in 1751 to learn Spanish, and then embarked with other scientists for Venezuela in February 1754. In Cumana he had entire charge of the department of natural history, and was assisted by two young Spanish doctors. He introduced the first microscope in Venezuela. His prematural death was considered a great loss to natural history, and especially to botany. Linnæus believed the loss irreparable. The manuscripts of Löfling, which were found after his death, were preserved by his two assistants and Linnnæus posthumously published his Iter Hispanicum, eller resa til Spanska Länderna uti Europa och America 1751 til 1756 in 1758. Parque Löefling in Ciudad Guayana, Venezuela is named after him.

Henri François Pittier (August 13, 1857, Bex, Switzerland – January 27, 1950, Caracas, Venezuela) was a Swiss-born geographer and botanist. He graduated as an engineer from the University of Jena and moved to Costa Rica in 1887, where he founded the Physical Geographic Institute and an herbarium. Pittier arrived in Venezuela in 1917, where he classified more than 30,000 plants and devoted many years to studying the flora and fauna in the country. In 1937 had achieved the creation of the Rancho Grande National Park at north of Maracay, Aragua state, the first national park of Venezuela. The plant genera Pittiera (now considered a synonym of Polyclathra), Pittierella (now considered a synonym of Cryptocentrum) and Pittierothamnus (now considered a synonym of Amphidasya) are named after him. His name is also associated with Pittier's crab-eating rat, Ichthyomys pittieri. In 1953 the Rancho Grande National Park was renamed in his honour as Henri Pittier National Park.

William H. Phelps (New York, June 14, 1875 – Caracas, December 8, 1965) was an American ornithologist and businessman. He studied biology at Milton Academy and Harvard College. In the summer of 1896 he decided to go on an ornithological exploration to Venezuela following the advice of Wirt Robinson, who had visited Margarita Island the year before, and from his mentor Frank M. Chapman. After a long stay in Sucre and Monagas, he became fascinated with the country and its birds. He returned to the United States with a small collection of specimens that he brought to Chapman at the American Museum of Natural History. The specimens he collected became the basis for his first publication published with Chapman in 1897. Once he finished his studies at Harvard, Phelps returned to Venezuela in 1897, to marry Alicia Elvira Tucker and settle in Maturín. There he began one of many successful business ventures by selling coffee and in 1930 founded Radio Caracas Radio. In 1938 he founded the Phelps Collection considered the largest ornithological collection in Latin America and the largest private collection in the world. It is a mandatory study resource on tropical birds for experts who wish to know more about this area. Currently the Phelps Collection has a heritage of 80,000 birds in feathers, a thousand preserved in alcohol and 1,500 skeletons. His second son, William H. Phelps Jr. founded RCTV in 1953, became one of his foremost collaborators in all matters concerning ornithology.

Hermano Ginés (Bilbao, 1912 – Caracas, 2011). Born under the name of Pablo Mandazen Soto, Hermano Ginés arrived in Caracas in 1939, when Venezuela awoke from the lethargy of the long gomecista dictatorship. Poverty and illiteracy were combined with epidemics, when oil seemed to give a new impetus to the country. It is thus that Hermano Ginés together with committed young students of the College La Salle of Caracas, created in 1940 the Society of Natural Sciences La Salle, from which the La Salle Foundation born in 1957. These visionaries sowed the seed of science, knowledge and education, in a country urged by lights. Along with the biologist Fernando Cervigón founded the Estación de Investigaciones Marinas de Margarita ("Margarita Marine Research Station"), where, discovered and described many species of fish of the South Eastern Caribbean, in addition to teaching ichthyology courses, directed several professorial and postgraduate theses. He was the author of several works on the fish, and on the coastal and ocean environment. of Venezuela. Among these was the multi volume Los Peces Marinos de Venezuela ("The Marine Fish of Venezuela") which started publication in 1966 with its first two volumes, with the sixth and final volume being published in 2011. He was also the co founder and president of the Museo del Mar of Margarita. Several centers of La Salle Foundation today rooted in most places of Venezuela, serving its people and its Environment.

Leandro Aristeguieta (Guasipati, 1923 – Caracas, 2012), botanist graduated at the Central University of Venezuela. In 1959 participated in the design of the Park of the East (now Park Generalísimo Francisco de Miranda) together with Brazilian landscape architect Roberto Burle Marx, Fernando Tabora and John Stoddart, who combined the majesty of the national flora with a small but varied zoological collection. Individual number of the Academy of Physical, Mathematical and Natural Sciences, having been 1st vice-president (1997–2001), and president (2001–2003). In his honor was designated a Hall of the Faculty of Sciences of the Central University of Venezuela. Doctor Honoris Causa of the University of Carabobo.

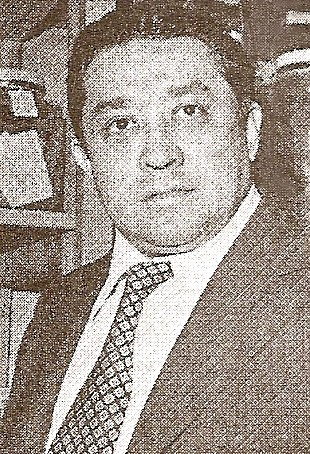
Francisco Mago Leccia

Francisco Mago Leccia (Tumeremo, Bolívar State, Venezuela, May 21, 1931 – Puerto La Cruz, Anzoátegui State, Venezuela on February 27, 2004). Mago was a distinguished Venezuelan ichthyologist who specialized in electric fish of the rivers and lagoons of South America, particularly of Venezuela. His education was Docent in Biology and Chemistry graduate from the "Instituto Pedagógico de Caracas", (today Universidad Pedagógica Experimental El Libertador), Master of Sciences (Marine Biology) from the University of Miami, Florida, U.S.A., Doctor in Sciences from Universidad Central de Venezuela. His Doctoral Thesis was entitled: “Los peces Gymnotiformes de Venezuela: un estudio preliminar para la revisión del grupo en la América del Sur” (The Gymnotiformes fish of Venezuela: a preliminary study for the revision of the group in South America).

Mago was a founding member of the Instituto Oceanográfico de la Universidad de Oriente in Cumaná Sucre state Venezuela and a founding member of the Instituto de Zoologia Tropical (IZT) de la Universidad Central de Venezuela situated in Caracas Venezuela. He was a teacher of the chair of Animal Biology, Vertebrate Biology and Systematic Ichthyology at the Biology School of Sciences Faculty of the Universidad Central de Venezuela. He was director of the Museo de Biología de la Universidad Central de Venezuela (MBUCV) and Acuario Agustín Codazzi. He was editor of the Acta Biologica Venezuelica (ABV). In 1968 he founded the Mago Collection of MBUCV considered the largest ichthyological collection in Latin America. Currently the Mago Collection has a heritage of 33,000 fishes preserved in alcohol and skeletons.

Gustavo Adolfo Romero (born in Caracas in 1955). Botanist graduated at Central University of Venezuela has a PhD at Harvard University, where he also works as research specialist and curator of Herbarium Orchid Oakes Ames replaces Leslie A. Garay. Romero has an important contribution with 248 records on identification and classification of new species of Orchidaceae, which regularly publish in: Novon; Harvard Pap. Bot.; Botanic Explorer; Monographics System Botanichal, Missouri Botanic Garden; Collection of Orchids Brazil; Brittonia; Selbyana; Orchidee; Orchids Venezuela; Lindleyana. Part of the editors at Lankesteriana and the Botanical Institute of Venezuela. Some publications include: G. Carnevali, G.A. Romero-González. Orchidaceae 1991. Dunstervillorum I: A new Dryadella from Venezuelan Guayana. Novon, Vol 1, No. 2, pp. 73–75. Leslie A. Garay, G.A. Romero-González. Schedulae 1998. Orchidum. 10 pp. Romero-González, GA, G. Carnevali Fernández-Concha. 2000. Orchids in Venezuela, an Illustrated Field Guide, 2nd ed. Armitano Editores, Caracas. 364 pp. G. Carnevali, I. Ramirez, G.A. Romero-González, C.A. Vargas, E. Foldats. 2003. Orchidaceae. pp. 200–619. PE Berry et al., Ed., Flora of Venezuelan Guayana Vol. 7. Missouri Botanic Garden, St. Louis. The GARomero abbreviation is used to indicate the author when citing a botanical name.

Niklaus Grünwald

Niklaus Grünwald (born in Caracas in 1965). Venezuelan- American biologist and plant pathologist of German and Swiss ancestry. He obtained a Bachelor of Science in plant science at University of California, Davis (UC Davis) in 1992. He completed his PhD in ecology and plant pathology in 1997 at UC Davis studying the effect of cover crop decomposition on soil nutrient cycling and soil microbiology. Grünwald pursued postdoctoral research at Cornell University. His academic research focuses on the evolution, genomics, and ecology of plant pathogens in the genus Phytophthora and management of the diseases they cause. This pathogen group includes some of the most costly diseases affecting crops and ecosystems. These pathogens have well characterized effectors to circumvent plant host recognition that in the genus Phytophthora include RxLR, Crinkler and other small secreted proteins. Grünwald is best known for providing novel insights into how plant pathogens emerge, methods to study pathogen evolution, particularly when populations are clonal, and characterizing the evolutionary history of Phytophthora pathogens. He is currently working with the USDA Agricultural Research Service, a professor (courtesy) in the Department of Botany and Plant Pathology at Oregon State University, and a professor (adjunct) in the Department of Plant Pathology and Plant-Microbe Biology at Cornell University.

=== Epidemiology ===
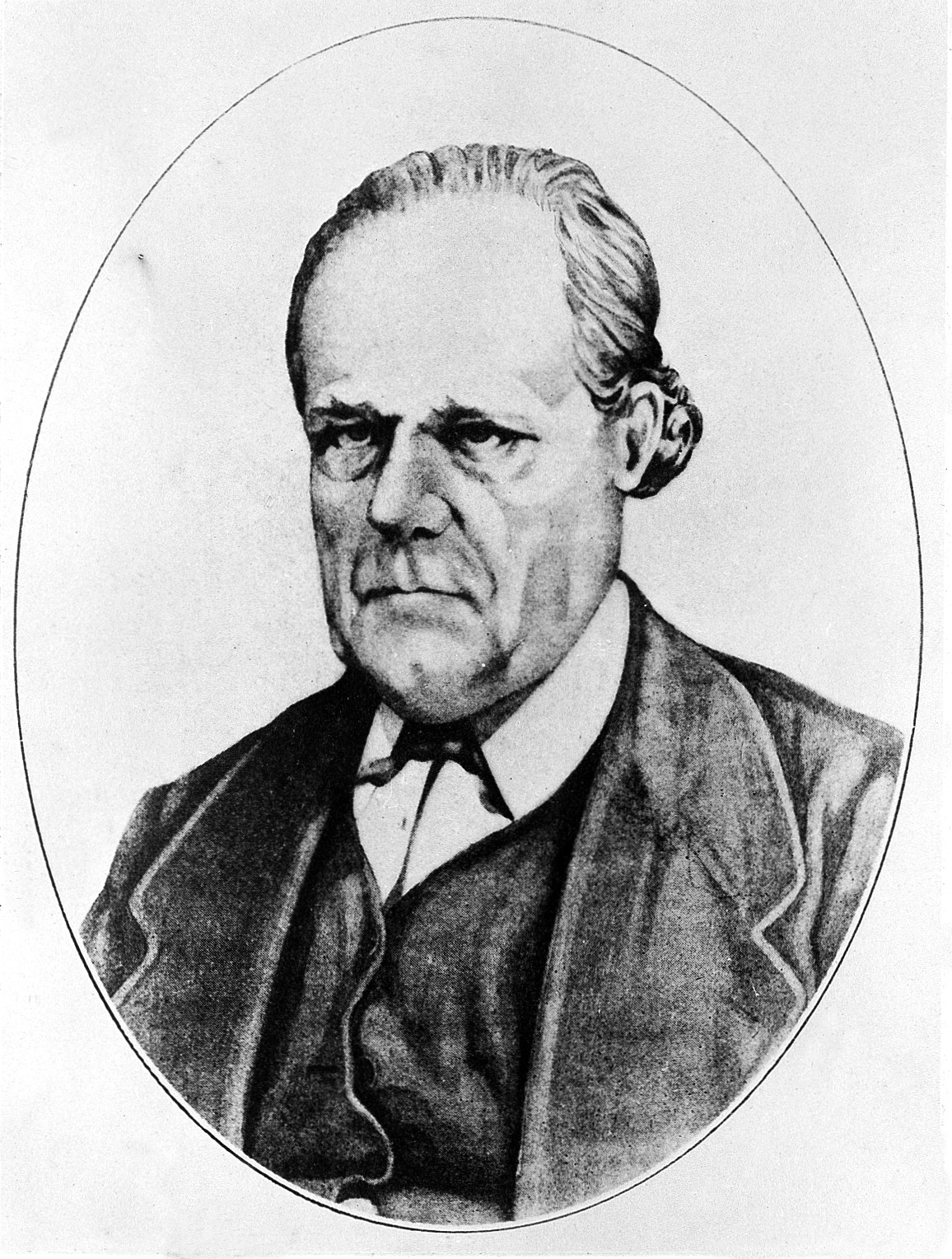
Louis-Daniel Beauperthuy

Louis-Daniel Beauperthuy (Basse-Terre, Guadeloupe, France, August 25, 1808 – Demerara, British Guiana, September 3, 1871) was a Venezuelan-French physician who made important contributions to the study of the causes of infectious diseases such as yellow fever, malaria, and leprosy. He was the first to systematically argue that malaria and yellow fever were transmitted by mosquitos. He studied medicine at the Paris Faculty of Medicine, and obtained his M.D. in 1837. He was immediately appointed by the Paris Museum of Natural History as a "Travelling Naturalist" to work in Orinoco basin, Venezuela. He was one of the earliest scientists to observe microorganism using microscopy in relation to diseases. In 1838 he developed a theory that all infectious diseases were due to parasitic infection with "animalcules" (microorganisms). With the help of his friend M. Adele de Rosseville, he presented his theory in a formal presentation before the French Academy of Sciences in Paris. He suspected that mosquitos were the carriers of the infectious pathogens, including those of leprosy. In 1842 he worked at the Facultad Médica de Caracas (Caracas Medical School). In 1850 he became professor of anatomy at the School of Medicine of the college of Cumana. He was appointed the director of the Leper Hospital in Demerara in British Guiana, the post he held till his death. By 1853, he was convinced that malaria and yellow fever were spread by mosquitos. He even identified the particular group of mosquitos that transmit yellow fever as the "domestic species" of "striped-legged mosquito", which can be recognised as Aedes aegypti, the actual vector. He published his theory in 1854 in the Gaceta Oficial de Cumana ("Official Gazette of Cumana"). His reports were assessed by an official commission, which discarded his mosquito theory. Only after 1891, with the works of Carlos Finlay, his investigations are reviewed with seriousness. A hospital in Basse-Terre, called the Centre hospitalier Louis-Daniel Beauperthuy, was established in 1959 in his honour.

Rafael Rangel (Betijoque, 1877-Caracas, 1909). Venezuelan scientist and researcher, who devoted himself to tropical diseases. He is considered the father of parasitology and bioanalysis in Venezuela. He is famous for being the first to describe in Venezuela the Necator americanus, parasite that caused hookworm, between 1903 and 1904. As a researcher, in 1902 Rangel was appointed first director of the laboratory of histology and bacteriology of Vargas Hospital. In 1908, at the request of President Cipriano Castro, he was in charge of the sanitary campaign to eradicate bubonic plague in La Guaira. A year later, after falling into depression by several problems that arose during the plague and by the refusal to a longed for scholarship abroad, he committed suicide with cyanide. His remains were buried in the National Pantheon on August 20, 1977.

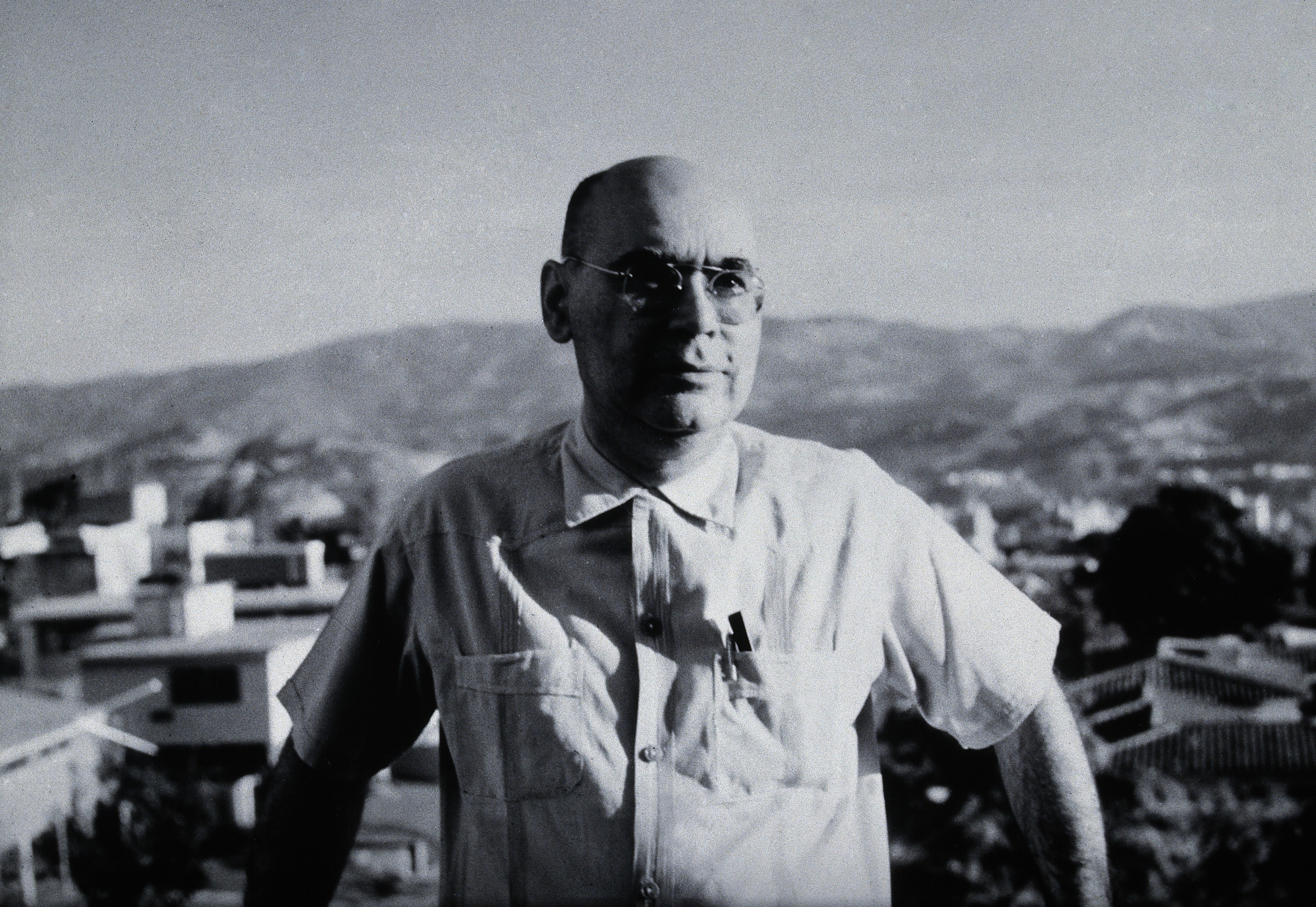
Arnoldo Gabaldón

Arnoldo Gabaldón (Trujillo, March 1, 1909 – Caracas, September 1, 1990) was a physician, researcher and politician. Graduated in 1928 earned a doctorate in medical sciences at the Universidad Central de Venezuela. In Germany completed a specialty at the Institute for Maritime and Tropical Diseases of Hamburg. Later traveling in 1935 to the United States as a fellow of the Rockefeller Foundation to obtain a doctorate from Johns Hopkins University in hygiene sciences with speciality in protozoology. Back in Venezuela he was appointed to head the newly created Special Directorate of Malariology within the Ministry of Health and Welfare, a position he held until 1950. Under the direction of Gabaldón, Venezuela became the first country which organized a nationwide campaign against malaria by using DDT, which led to be the first to achieve eradication of the disease in a large area extension of the tropical zone. He also discovered new species of malarial parasites and devoted himself to studying the mosquito Anopheles nuneztovari, action that catalyzed the recognition of educational needs and preparing managerial staff of the Ministry of Health, through the creation of the school that bears his name in Maracay, a deep and additional contribution. Between 1959 and 1964 President Rómulo Betancourt appointed him Minister of Health and Welfare and Gabaldón. He was the first professor of the Simón Bolívar Chair of Latin-American Studies at the University of Cambridge, England (1968–69) and directed post-doctoral studies at the Central University of Venezuela. Gabaldón wrote more than 200 papers published in national and international medical journals. Gabaldón was active as an expert of the World Health Organization (WHO) for malaria control in countries from 5 continents.

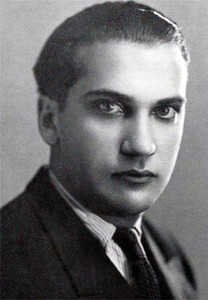
Jacinto Convit

Jacinto Convit (Caracas, September 11, 1913 – Caracas-May 12, 2014) was a physician and researcher, known for developing a vaccine to fight leprosy and his studies to cure different types of cancer. In 1987, he received the Prince of Asturias Award in the Scientific and Technical Research category. Inspired by leprosy victims, he entered medical school at Central University of Venezuela (UCV) in 1932. He earned his title as a Medical Science Doctor in 1938. In 1968, Convit was elected president of the International Leprosy Association (ILA) and was re-elected in 1973. In 1971, Convit was named by the WHO as director of the Co-operative Centre for the Study and Histological Classification of Leprosy. In 1976, Convit was elected director of the Pan American Research and Training in Leprosy and Tropical Diseases. He was also named president of the International Journal of Leprosy. In 1987, Convit added killed Mycobacterium leprae to the BCG vaccine. The combined vaccine was tested worldwide, but was not more effective than regular BCG. A vaccine for leishmaniasis was later developed using Convit's method. He also worked on mycosis, onchocerciasis, and other tropical diseases. In 1988, the Venezuelan government nominated Convit for a Nobel Prize in Medicine for his experimental anti-leprosy vaccine.

Felix Pifano (San Felipe, Yaracuy, May 1, 1912 – August 8, 2003) was a Venezuelan physician and researcher, graduated in the Central University of Venezuela (1935) and laureate of the National Academy of Medicine in Paris. Back in Yaracuy he practiced tropical medicine with Enrique Tejera in the institute that he had founded 10 years earlier, treating diseases such as leishmaniasis, tuberculosis, diarrhea, and malaria. Together with Arnoldo Gabaldón he traveled through Central America in 1938 to follow the work of the Rockefeller Foundation in Costa Rica and Panama. With this training he worked with Gabaldón in the newly created Venezuelan Institute of Malariology, leading the effort to eradicate the yellow fever of Venezuela. In that position, along with Martín Mayer founded the research section of the National Institute of Hygiene in Caracas. In his recently founded section he studied Chagas disease, Trypanosoma rangeli, cutaneous and visceral leishmaniasis, intestinal and hepatic amebiasis, schistosomiasis, onchocerciasis, Systematic mycoses, malnutrition and poisonous animals. During the dictatorship of Marcos Perez Jiménez signed a document prepared by Arturo Uslar Pietri that forces him to exile in Mexico, where he studied cardiology. With the fall of the Venezuelan dictator, Pifano returned to Venezuela and founded the Institute of Tropical Medicine of the UCV and directed it for almost 50 years. This institute earned him immense affection from his disciples and respect in all spheres of national society.

=== Microbiology ===
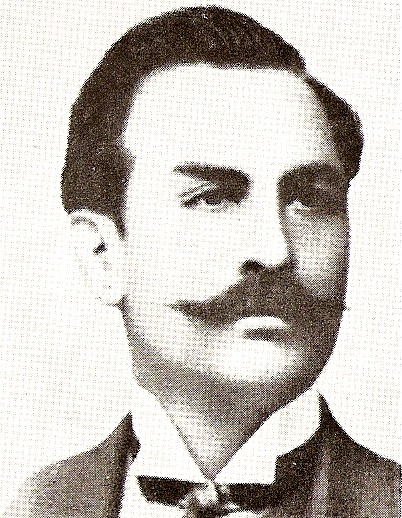
Manuel Núñez Tovar known as the "first Venezuelan entomologist"

Manuel Núñez Tovar (Caicara, Monagas, September 24, 1872 – Maracay, Aragua, January 27, 1928) was naturalist, researcher, parasitologist and entomologist. Nuñez Tovar began his studies at Caicara and later continued in Maturin, where he graduated from high school at age 16. The first two years studied medicine at the Federal College of Barcelona and gained the title at the Central University of Venezuela in 1895. In 1909, with Cesar Flamerich and Rafael Nuñez Isava, he was part of the Public Health Commission, and that same year he began his studies in entomology. In this discipline studied the importance of insects as vectors in the transmission of diseases, was the author of numerous papers and identified Necator americanus as the cause of anemia in patients who had suffered from malaria. After twenty years in Monagas state, Nuñez Tovar lived temporarily in Caracas and La Victoria, settling permanently in Maracay after being appointed medical brigade in the garrison of the city. During this time many animal species collected in the valleys of Aragua and around the Lake Valencia (Venezuela). Nuñez never left Venezuela, but scientists visited the country to personally know the voluminous scientific work included the discovery of several species of mosquitoes that carry his name. For his scientific legate, a high school and University Hospital of Maturin were named in his honor and his entomology collection was acquired by the government of Venezuela. This is preserved in the Department of Malariology and Environmental Sanitation, Ministry of Health of Maracay.

José Francisco Torrealba (Santa María de Ipire, June 16, 1896– Caracas, July 24, 1973). Graduated at the Central University of Venezuela as Doctor of Medical Sciences in 1922, he served as director of the "Asilo de Enajenados" in Caracas (1924–1927). In Germany visit the Institute of Tropical Diseases Hamburg in 1928. Since 1929, he studied with dedication the most frequent tropical diseases in the Venezuelan central plains: malaria, chagas, bilharziosis, intestinal parasitosis, elephantiasis, leishmaniasis, with special attention to Chagas Disease. He published numerous scientific works that make him an international personality in tropical medicine even without post-graduate studies. It is visited by important scientists such as Cecilio Romagna (Argentina), Maria and Leonidas Deanne, Antonio Dacio Franco do Amaral, Emmanuel Dias (Brazil), Jécar Nehgme (Chile), Emile Brumpt and Jean Coudert (France), Enrique Tejera, Arnoldo Gabaldon, Humberto Fernández Morán, Felix Pifano, Otto Hernandez Pieretti, José Vicente Scorza (Venezuela). He received numerous acknowledgments: "Vargas" Prize, "Brault" Prize awarded by the Academy of Medicine of Paris, Order of the Liberator Degree Commander, Applause of the Creole Petroleum Corporation, honorary professor of the Faculty of Medicine of the University of Los Andes, Corresponding Member of the National Academy of Medicine, Member of The Royal Society of Tropical Medicine and Hygiene, London, illustrious son of Santa Maria de Ipire, Andrés Bello Order (post mortem) in the Honor Band Class.

=== Immunology ===
Miguel Layrisse (Caracas, 1919-Caracas, 2002). He obtained his Doctor of Medical Sciences degree from the Central University of Venezuela in 1943. He completed his post-graduate studies at the Institute of Pathological Anatomy at Vargas Hospital and New England Medical Center in Boston. In 1949 he returned to Venezuela to devote himself to teaching and research. He was professor of the Central University (1944–1980), head of the Research Center of the Blood Bank (1952–1961), researcher of the Venezuelan Institute of Scientific Research (IVIC, 1961–1990). In his investigative activity on immunohematology and nutritional anemia he made important scientific findings at the national and international levels, such as the Diego blood factor and the use of precooked maize flour enriched with iron, vitamin A and β-carotenes that favor the absorption of iron, as a vehicle to decrease the rates of Anemia of the population. Throughout his career he served as president of the National Council for Scientific and Technological Research (1972–1975), was head of the Research Center of the Blood Bank (1952–1961), head of the Department of Pathophysiology of IVIC (1961–69 ), rector of the Central University of Venezuela (1976–1980) and director of the Venezuelan Institute of Scientific Research (1980–1984).

Baruj Benacerraf (Caracas October 29, 1920 – Jamaica Plain, Massachusetts, US, August 2, 2011) was a Venezuelan-born American immunologist, who shared the 1980 Nobel Prize in Physiology or Medicine for the "discovery of the major histocompatibility complex genes which encode cell surface protein molecules important for the immune system's distinction between self and non-self". His colleagues and shared recipients were Jean Dausset and George Davis Snell.

Raimundo Villegas (Caracas, September 14, 1931 – Caracas, October 21, 2014) Venezuelan physician, researcher and scientist graduated at the Central University of Venezuela. Thanks to the support of the Mendoza Foundation, between 1956 and 1958 he was a research fellow in the Laboratory of Biophysics at Harvard Medical School. As student and graduate, he participated between 1952 and 1957 in the Institute of Medical Research of the Luis Roche Foundation. In this institution, he carried out research on the mechanical resistance of tissues to know the effect of various substances on elasticity, which could have interesting repercussions on various diseases affecting tissue such as Varicose Veins or Pulmonary emphysema. In 1958, he was a researcher at the Venezuelan Institute of Scientific Research (IVIC), in charge of the Biophysics Laboratory. During this stage he concentrated on the biophysical and biochemical characterization of the peripheral nerve membranes – especially the nerve fibers of Squid and Sea lobster – and the sodium channel present in these membranes. From 1982, he continued his research from the Molecular Biology Unit of the Institute of Advanced Studies (IDEA), deepening the study of Neurotoxins, in the molecular biology of Neuronal Differentiation and Phylogenetics of Neurons. Director of the Venezuelan Institute of Scientific Research (1969–1974). In 1979 he was appointed as the first Minister of Science and Technology by the president Luis Herrera Campins.

José Esparza (born in Maracaibo on December 19, 1945) is a Venezuelan American virologist appointed as president of the Global Virus Network since January 2016. He is known for his efforts to promote the international development and testing of vaccines against HIV/AIDS. During 17 years (till 1985) he pursued an academic career at the Venezuelan Institute for Scientific Research (IVIC). From 1986 to 2014 he worked continuously as a viral vaccine expert and senior public health adviser for international health policy agencies such as the World Health Organization, the Joint United Nations Programme on HIV/AIDS, and the Bill & Melinda Gates Foundation. José G. Esparza is currently an adjunct professor of medicine, at the Institute of Human Virology (University of Maryland School of Medicine).

== Chemistry ==
=== Electro-chemistry ===
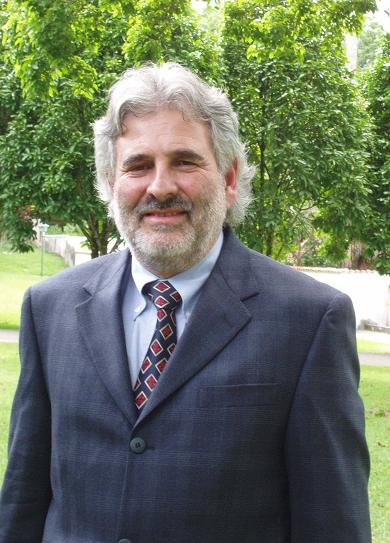
Benjamin Sharifker

Benjamín Scharifker Podolsky (born in Buenos Aires, Argentina, September 21, 1953). Sharifker migrated with his Jewish family to Venezuela when he was 4 years old. Graduated in chemistry from the Universidad Simón Bolívar (1976) had a PhD in physicochemistry from the University of Southampton (1980). Professor emeritus of Simón Bolívar University, where he was head of the department of chemistry (1987–1989), dean of research and development (1992–1996), vice-rector of administration (2001–2005) and rector (2005–2009). Coordinator of the Nuclei of Scientific, Humanistic and Technological Development Councils (1994–1996). Deputy director of the Hydrogen Research Center at Texas A & M University (1984–1986). Visiting professor at the Universities of Southampton (1988) and Bristol (2009). Director of National Council for Scientific and Technological Research (1994–1999). Secretary general, Caracas Chapter, Venezuelan Association for the Advancement of Science (2001). His investigation lines interest is interfacial electrochemistry, including kinetics of electrochemical reactions, phase formation, conducting polymers, energy conversion and environmental sanitation. Author of more than one hundred publications in the international scientific literature and three patents of invention registered in several countries. He has received, among other awards, the Tajima Award from the International Society of Electrochemistry (1986), Lorenzo Mendoza Fleury Award from the Empresas Polar Foundation (1993). Number Individual of the Academy of Physical, Mathematical and Natural Sciences (since 2003, president 2009–2011). Member of the Academy of Sciences of Latin America (since 2003). Fellow of the Academy of Sciences of the Developing World (TWAS, since 2009). Vice-rector academic (2010) and rector (since 2011) of the Metropolitan University, Caracas.

=== Food chemistry ===
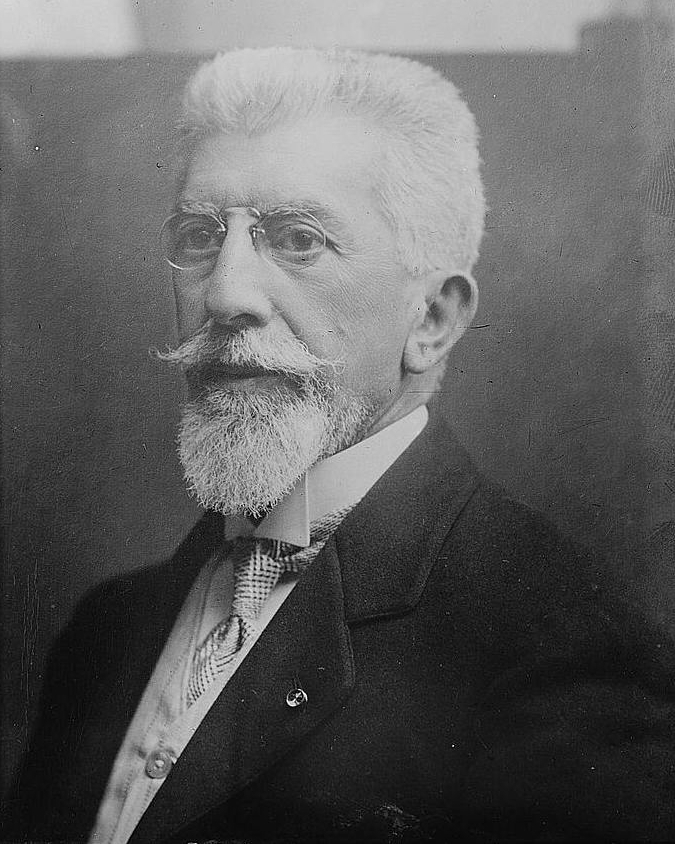
Vicente Marcano

Vicente Marcano (Caracas, October 27, 1848 -Valencia July 17, 1891) was an outstanding engineer, chemist, geologist, university professor and scientific disseminator. Graduated in philosophical sciences at the Central University of Venezuela, he continued his education at the French school of St. Louis, at the institution Davigneau de Lanneau and at the School of Arts and Manufactures of Paris. In 1887 he was appointed as chief of the Anthropology Commission, who conducted archaeological expeditions of Lake Valencia (May–June), the Orinoco (August–December), the Karstic Formations in the Monagas state and Falcón at the end of 1889. In these explorations Carlos Villanueva, Alfredo Jahn and Bonifacio Marcano also participated. Archaeological objects collected, were sent to Paris and today are in the Museum of Man. His exploration work served as a basis for the ethnological work of his brother Gaspar Marcano. Author of Elements of Chemical Philosophy where he defended the atomic theory (1881), wrote about his investigations in the Annales of the Science Agronomique Française et Etrangère, Bulletin of the Société Chimique de France and the Compte-Rendus, with wide popularization in Germany, England, United States and Venezuela. His main interest was the study of the fermentation of tropical fruits, the nitrated lands and the industrialization of sugar cane. In 1891, he founded the Municipal Laboratory in Caracas, later converted into the National Laboratory. His most important discovery was bromelain, a proteolytic enzyme extracted from pineapple juice. His remains were buried in the National Pantheon on July 10, 1991.

Werner Jaffé (Frankfurt, October 27, 1914 – Caracas, May 3, 2009) was a chemist and university professor. He received his doctoral degree at the University of Zurich under the supervision of the Nobel Prize winner Paul Karrer. After graduating, Jaffé arrived in Venezuela in 1940 and showed interest in the area of nutrition, focusing his attention on food toxicity, nutrient complementation, presence of antinutritional factors in edible legumes seeds, presence of selenium in food and enrichment of flours with minerals and vitamins. He was co-author of the Lactovisoy nutritional formula for scholars children's. He started the teaching of Biochemistry at the Venezuela Central University and founded the Instituto Nacional de Nutrición. He was cofounder of the Venezuelan Association for the Advancement of Science. in 1946 he received a grant from the Rockefeller Foundation and, among several science prizes, he was awarded the Premio Nacional de Ciencia, CONICIT in 1978. During the fifty years that he taught at the college level, he also published over 200 academic papers and was named honorary professor at the Simón Bolívar University.

=== Inorganic chemistry ===
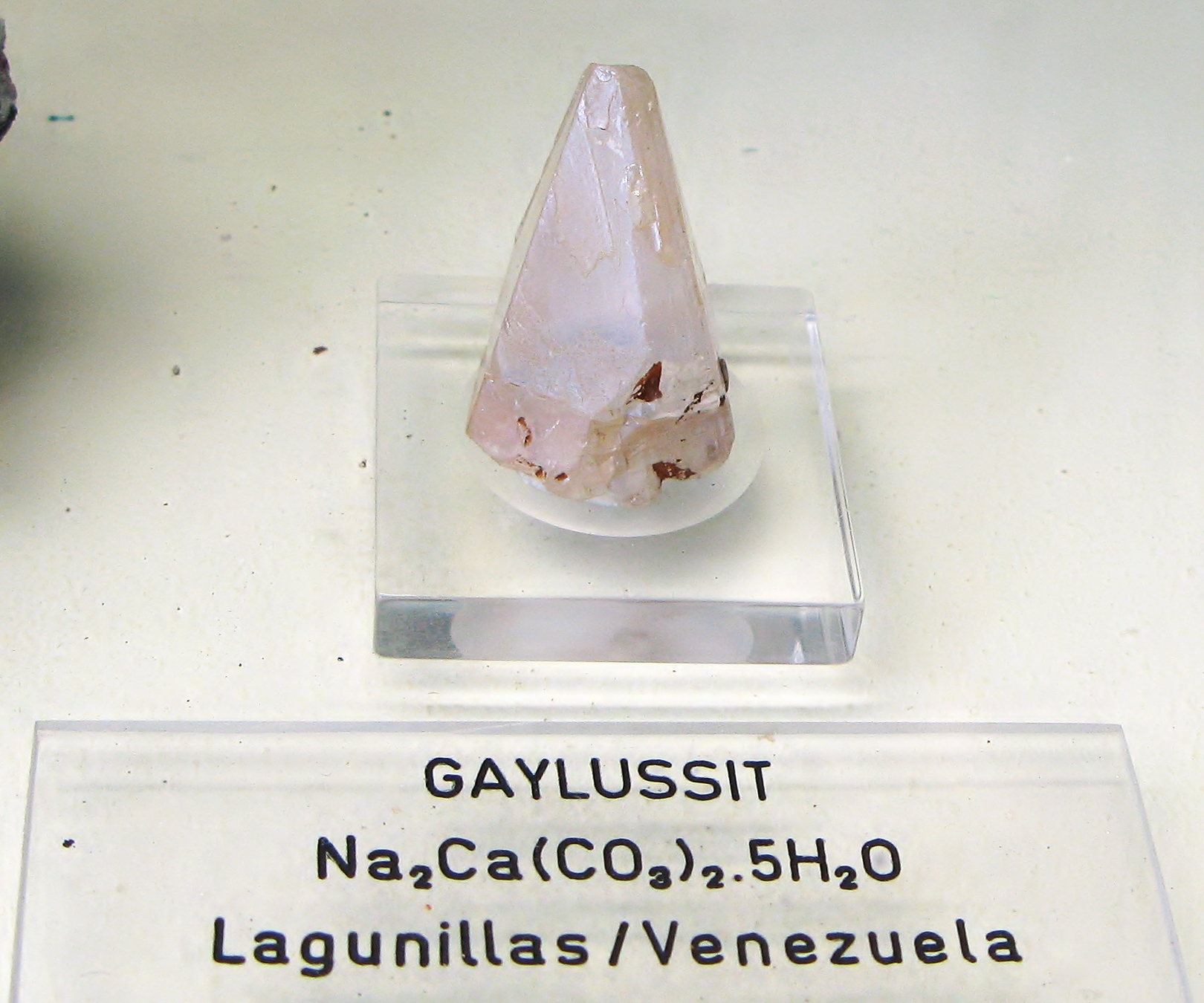
Mineral of Gaylussite discovered in Urao lagoon, Lagunillas, Mérida State, Venezuela

Manuel Palacio Fajardo (Mijagual, 1784 – Angostura, 1819). Venezuelan lawyer, physician, chemist, diplomatic and politician. Graduated at the University of Santa Fe (Vice royalty of New Granada) when the independence movement exploded in 1810, was practicing its profession as physician in Guanare. The province of Barinas elected him as his deputy to the first Constituent Congress of Venezuela, and as such signed on July 5, 1811, the absolute independence from Spanish rule. In 1812, after the fall of First Republic, he was exiled to United Provinces of the New Granada. The patriotic government of Cartagena de Indias commissioned him with Pedro Gual as diplomats to seek foreign support for the Spanish-American independence cause. They arrived in Washington in December 1812 and although they meet with the president James Madison this indicated that the United States could not take part in the war by the No Aggression Agreement signed with Spain under Neutrality Act (1794). During his stay in Europe he studied chemistry and perfected his medical knowledge. In London he published several articles on natural sciences. Three are known: On the exploitation of carbonates of sodium in the Urao lagoon of Mérida province (1816), Notes on the main circumstances of the earthquake of Caracas (1817) and a Geographic description of Valley of Cúcuta (1817). In 1818 is back in Venezuela with militars of British Legion contracted by him in London along with Luis Lopez Mendez. In 1819 was elected deputy and is witness of exception of the installation of the Congress of Angostura the February 15, 1819. A few days later the Liberator Simon Bolivar appointed him as Secretary of State of Colombia but he is seriously ill and does not assume the charge because he died on May 8, 1819.His remains were buried in the National Pantheon on August 21, 1876.

Rodolfo Loero Arismendi (Río Caribe, Sucre, September 26, 1896 – Caracas, March 6, 1987). He was son of Domenico Loero Luigi, an Italian immigrant, and Inés María Arismendi Lairet. He completed studies at the Central University of Venezuela, gained the title of Odontologist in 1917. He then pursued his studies, graduating from Chemistry at the University of Sarriá, Spain. Back in Caracas, he attended the Chemistry Chart at the Central University of Venezuela. He was notable for his educational contributions to this university, as well as other educational institutions such as Los Dos Caminos College, the Sucre College, National Pedagogical Institute and the Lyceum Fermin Toro. He founded and directed for more than 35 years the first School of Industrial Chemistry in Venezuela, and in 1943 founded the Instituto Universitario Tecnologico Rodolfo Loero Arismendi (IUTIRLA). He worked with the first procedures of color photography in the National Photographic Laboratory.

=== Organic chemistry ===
Augusto Bonazzi (Rome, December 1890 – Caracas, March 1974). Bonazzi studied chemistry in the Universities of Naples and Earth Sciences in University of Rome. From 1911 to 1924 he worked as researcher at Wooster Experimental Agricultural Station in Ohio, United States. In 1926 moved to Havana (Cuba) and became director of the Sugar Cane Experimental Station of the American Sugar Refining Company. In 1937 he arrived in Venezuela as a researcher at the Chemistry Laboratory at the El Valle Experimental Station and later was nominated director of the Research Service of the Ministry of Agriculture. In Caracas founded the School of Agriculture and Zootecnia of the Central University of Venezuela, that soon would become the Faculty of Agronomic Engineering. He was Professor of Chemistry of the Faculty of Pharmacy of the UCV, and when the Faculty of Sciences was created in 1958, he became Professor of the School of Chemistry, of which he was director until his death in 1974. He was also founder of the Venezuelan Society of Chemistry in 1938 where it publishes, an important number of articles of scientific diffusion in magazines and newspapers of national coverage. Bonazzi was member of the Special Committee for the Standardization of Methods of Edaphic Microbiology of the International Society of Pedology and candidate for the Nobel Prize in Chemistry in 1969. Dr. Bonazzi founded the studies in geochemistry in Venezuela; throughout his career opened lines of research that still persist in the Institute of Earth Sciences, the former Institute of Chemistry that he directed since 1964 and which formed a considerable number of professionals in that area.

Oscar Grünwald (Graz, 1895 – Caracas, 1978). Austrian-Venezuelan Chemist. Officer of the Austro-Hungarian army during the First World War (1915–1918). Graduated in chemical engineering from the Polytechnic Institute (Technische Hochschule) in Graz, Austria (1922). He worked as laboratory technician in the potash mines (Kaliwerke) Biegraunschw-Lyneburg, Grasleben, Germany and Riva Fabrics. A. G., Vienna, Austria, and Poland. In 1927 emigrated to Dominican Republic contracted by Jaboneras Unidas del Cibao, and the National Laboratory of the Secretary of Health and Welfare. He arrived in Venezuela in 1930 in the group of foreign scientist under contract to develop the agriculture in this country. From 1930 to 1937, he worked at the Chemical Laboratory for the Directorate of Health (after 1931, Ministry of Health and Agriculture and Breeding) and from 1937 as director of the Laboratory of Agricultural Chemistry (later Department and Division of Chemistry ) of the Agriculture Directorate of the Ministry of Agriculture and Breeding (MAC). In the period 1937–1953, he was a professor of chemistry at the School of Agriculture (later the Faculty of Agronomic Engineering of the Central University of Venezuela), and one of the founders of the faculty along with Ludwig Schnee, Augusto Bonazzi, Luis Maria Eleizalde, and Jaime Henao Jaramillo, among others. He was a founding member of the Venezuela Symphony Orchestra, created in 1930, played first solo violist (ad-honorem) until 1947. Until his last years he made quartets with Pedro Antonio Rios Reyna, Renato Bellacci, José Antonio Escobar Saluzzo and Soriano Ruthman. He was an ordinary member of the Venezuelan Association of Engineers (CIV), the Venezuelan Society of Natural Sciences and the American Chemical Society, and a founding member of the Venezuelan Chemical Society. A convinced environmentalist, Grünwald worked on studies on Lake Valencia, Catia La Mar and the use of coumarin. In 1955 was a precursor of the Morón Petrochemical Complex. He died in Caracas on September 13, 1978.

Gioconda Cunto de San Blas (born in Caracas in 1943). Graduated in Chemistry (UCV, 1967), PhD Biochemistry (Heriot-Watt University, Edinburgh, Scotland, 1972), Emeritus Titular Researcher (Venezuelan Institute of Scientific Research, IVIC) where she did her full scientific career (1972–2010) in the field of biochemistry and cell biology of pathogenic fungi. She is the author of more than 130 publications in specialized international journals, author of three books on pathogenic fungi, published by Caister Academic Press, Norfolk, UK, between 2004 and 2008. In 2009 she was elected as the first woman president of the Academy of Sciences of Venezuela.

== Engineering ==
=== Civil engineering ===
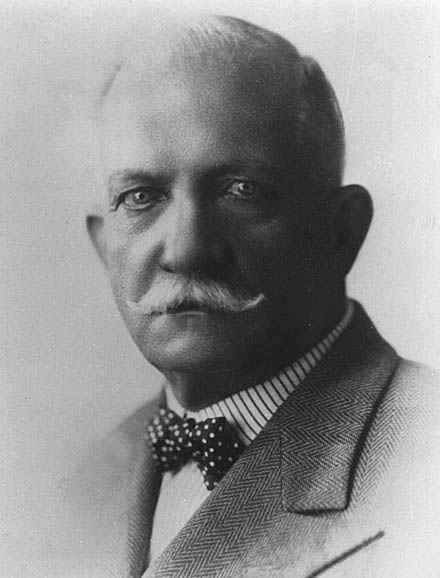
Alfredo Jahn (1867– 1942)

Alfredo Jahn (Caracas, 1867– Caracas,1942) finished his studies at the Central University of Venezuela in 1886. The following year, he participated in the preliminary studies for the construction of a major railroad between Caracas and Valencia with extension to San Carlos. As a Civil Engineer, he worked with civil engineer and lawyer German Jimenez in the National Plan of Highways and Railroads of Venezuela by order of the National Government. He was responsible for the construction of the railroad from Caracas to Valencia. He also built the highway from Caracas to El Junquito. In 1887 he accompanied the Venezuelan chemist Vicente Marcano on a scientific expedition to the upper Orinoco river, sent by President Antonio Guzmán Blanco. The trip provided geographical positions and a collection of plants and archaeological objects found today in United States and Germany. As a geographer he identified the levels of the Lake of Valencia, its tributaries river and determined all the heights of the Range of the Coast. He lived with the Orinoco basin indigenous people and wrote books on their customs and dialects. As a botanist he classified many plants in Venezuela, donated rare specimen samples to the Smithsonian Institution, and wrote a book on the Palms of Venezuela (the Palms of the Flora Venezuelana – Caracas 1908). In 1911 he became the first person to ascend Pico Humboldt in the Sierra Nevada de Mérida in Venezuela. As founding member of the Sociedad Venezolana de Ciencias Naturales (Venezuelan Society of Natural Sciences) was its president in 1935 and 1937. He received an honorary doctorate from the University of Hamburg, and the Medal of the Berlin Geographical Society. He received the Order of the Liberator. The Alfredo Jahn Cave in Miranda is named for him; it is the sixth largest in the country.

=== Hydraulic engineering ===
Ignacio Rodríguez-Iturbe (Maracaibo, Zulia State, 1942) is a Venezuelan hydrologist. Graduated from the University of Zulia as a civil engineer studied at Caltech, earning his PhD at Colorado State University in 1967. Rodríguez-Iturbe has taught at many universities, including the University of Zulia, Simon Bolivar University, MIT, Texas A&M, and the University of Iowa. He was awarded with the Robert E. Horton Medal (1998), the Stockholm Water Prize (2002) and the William Bowie Medal (2009). He has been a member of the US National Committee for the International Institute for Applied Systems Analysis since 2004. In 2008, he received a special recognition from the World Cultural Council. In 2010 was elected as Member of the United States National Academy of Sciences. and was appointed by Pope Benedict XVI to the Pontifical Academy of Sciences He currently serves as the James S. McDonnell Distinguished University Professor at Princeton University.

=== Food engineering ===
Carlos Roubicek (Praga, 1916– Caracas, 2004) Czech master brewer of Jewish origin. In 1937 emigrated to Ecuador after the occupation of his country by Adolf Hitler troops. On January 1, 1943, he joined the Polar Group of Venezuela founded in 1941 by Lorenzo Alejandro Mendoza Fleury. Four months after his entry, Roubicek raised the board of directors the need to change the formula of the beer as it detected that the consumer wanted a product more refreshing and so adapt it to the Venezuelan palate and our tropical climate. Then decided to make a variation in the ingredients of the beer, replace 20% of the malted barley with corn flakes (also known as beer chips) and add more carbon dioxide. So he managed to reformulate the Polar beer adapting it to the consumer's taste, printing it an unrivaled body and flavor. This led her quickly to occupy the first place in the preference of Venezuelans. In 1954 created the process to produce the corn flake for Polar Group in order to substitute the import of this raw material. Counting by then with three brewing plants in operation and being the corn flakes one of the main ingredients of the beer formula, the company decided to build its own corn processing plant in Turmero, Aragua state. This decision would be a decisive step in the later development of the food business the precooked maize flour Harina P.A.N. for the arepas. Roubicek told: "Juan had the idea of making a flour to make arepas with the corn flakes that we used in the beer industry. I met with some manufacturers of arepas – in areperas – that existed in the country and they considered our project to be very complicated. I thought that if we changed the grinding and the humidity of the "Corn Flakes", we could get a precooked flour that would not give so much work to the housewife. I called a Remavenca technician to prepare a sample and we got what we wanted." Launched in 1960 the Harina P.A.N. rapidly gained acceptance among housewives because of the tremendous saving in domestic labor and its high quality.

=== Structural engineering ===
Ibrahim López García (Cabure, 1925 – Maracaibo, 1994). A visionary like few formed in civil engineering, exerted for many years the teaching and the investigation in the Central University of Venezuela and the University of Zulia. His practice was based on a careful observation of nature, its surprising structures and designs. He tried to make engineering proposals lighter and fresh, optimizing resources and reducing environmental impact. As a result of these deep convictions, he founded the Social Ecological Movement for the XXI Century at the end of the sixties, with strong environmental principles. He also carried out several construction projects such as the roof of the "José Pérez Colmenares Stadium" ( Maracay, Aragua state) in which his new thinking becomes evident with a design inspired by the shape of the palm leaf. In 1970, he prepared a challenging work of promotion, titled On tops, domes and flights that tried to break with some paradigms of the modernity. First, it criticizes our reliance on fire-based technology, on combustion, by proposing the use of alternative energies. He criticizes that humans have been inspired by fish and birds to design aircraft, helicopters and submarines since its principle is linear, which in its opinion has the result of waste of energy and fuel. Thanks to a study that for a long time made on the spores, shells of turtles and other natural domes, proposes the construction of an airship based on the way of moving of these beings. His airship model consisted of a large central dome surrounded by a ring of aerodynamic rotating domes that would allow it to travel in the air and even in the water, to which is added an engine that applies the laws of electromagnetism.

=== Petroleum engineering ===
Gustavo Inciarte Perich (1938, Maracaibo, Venezuela – 2010, Norman, Oklahoma). Graduated with a Bachelor of Science degree in petroleum engineering from the University of Oklahoma in 1957 and later revalidated his title at the Universidad del Zulia. Inciarte was the first Venezuelan to become chief petroleum engineer for any of SHELL's Group of Companies Worldwide, and after many years of a very successful career in PDVSA was named the first president of INTEVEP (Venezuela's Technology Research and Development Center). In 1998 he was the first Latin American elected as president of the Society of Petroleum Engineers (SPE). In 1998 ended his 41-year career in the oil industry as a member of PDVSA board which was, at the time, one of the biggest oil companies in the world. Since 2003 he was a visiting research scholar at the University of Oklahoma, in the Sarkeys Energy Center, and worked mainly with the Energy Institute of the Americas.

== Inventors ==
Carlos del Pozo y Sucre (1743, Calabozo – 1814, Camaguán) is probably the first outstanding inventor that Venezuela had. Alexander von Humboldt mentions a meeting with this man in 1800 cite:We found in Calabozo, in the heart of the plains, an electric machine of large disks, electrophores, batteries, electrometers, a material almost as complete as that of our physicists in Europe. All these objects had not been purchased in the United States; Were the work of a man who had never seen any instrument, which no one could consult, who did not know the phenomena of electricity more than by reading the Treaty of Sigaud de Lafond (Joseph Aignan Sigaud de Lafond) and the Memoirs of Franklin (Benjamin Franklin). Journey to the Equinoctial Regions of the New Continent. In 1804 participated with the Spanish scientist Francisco Javier Balmis in the vaccination against smallpox in Venezuela. Del Pozo was a partisan of the Spanish colonial government and for this reason he received no support from the new independist government established in 1811. He died forgotten in 1814.

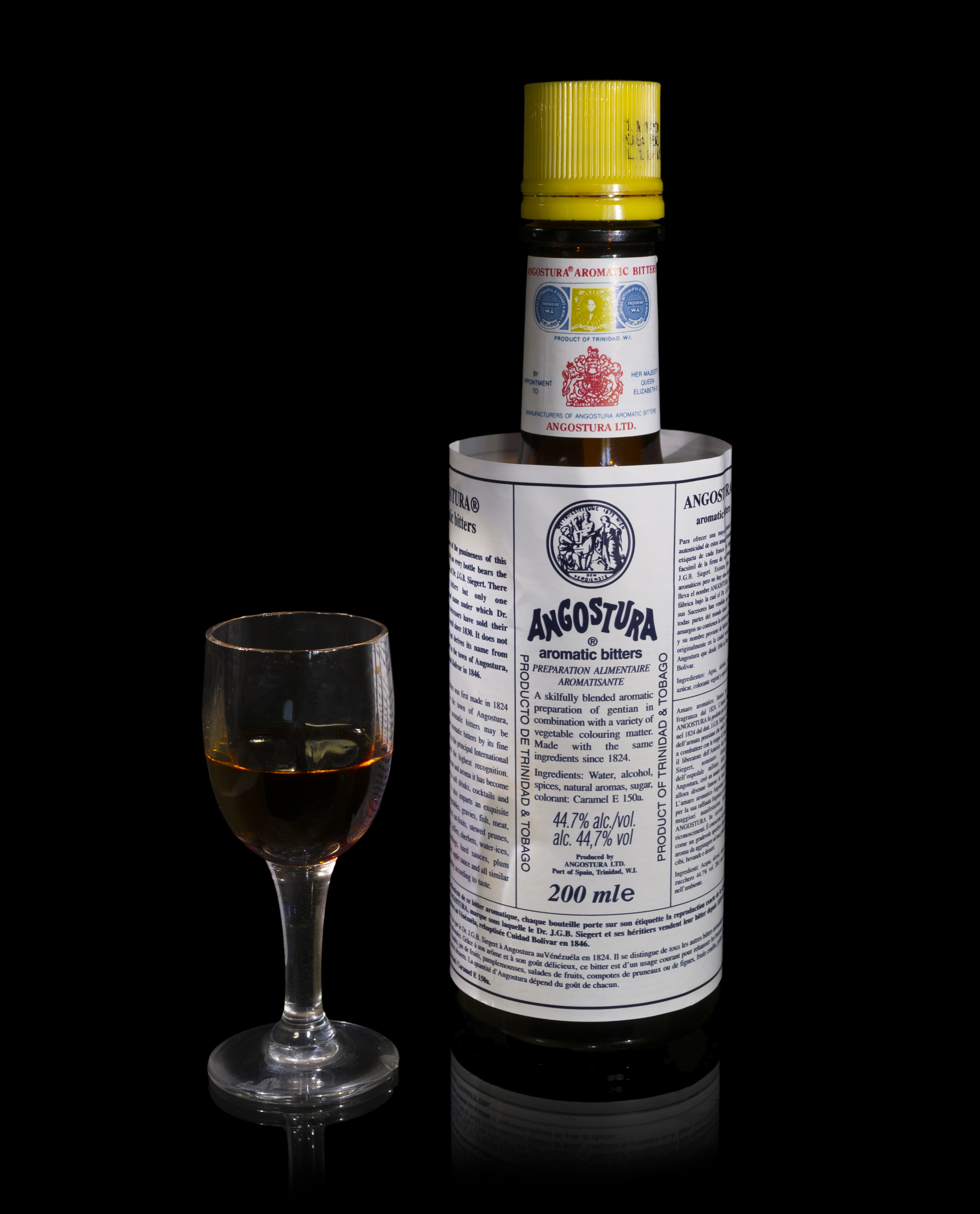
A bottle of Angostura aromatic bitters with its distinctive oversized label

Johann Gottlieb Benjamin Siegert (Grosswaltz, 1796– Ciudad Bolivar, 1870), German surgeon general in Simón Bolívar's army who developed the recipe of the called Angostura bitter as a tonic for soldiers affected by upset stomachs and tropical diseases. Siegert began to sell it in 1824 and established a distillery for the purpose in 1830. Siegert was based in the town of Angostura, now Ciudad Bolívar, and used locally available ingredients, perhaps aided by botanical knowledge of the local Amerindians. The product was exported abroad from 1853 used for flavouring cocktails, beverages or less often, food. In 1875 the plant was moved from Ciudad Bolivar to Port of Spain, Trinidad, where it remains. Angostura bitter won a medal at the Weltausstellung 1873 Wien. The medal is still depicted on the oversized label, along with reverse which shows Emperor Franz Joseph I of Austria in profile. The exact formula is a closely guarded secret, with only one person knowing the whole recipe, passed hereditarily.

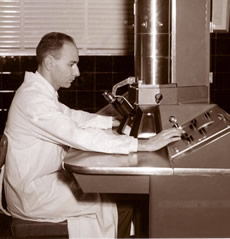
Humberto Fernández-Morán on the electron microscope at IVIC in the 1950s

Francisco de Asís Delgado Jugo (Maracaibo, October 4, 1830 – Vichy, August 8, 1887) Ophthalmologist. Delgado Jugo is considered an eminent ophthalmologist and the most important among the founders of Spanish ophthalmology. He began his medical studies in Universidad Central de Venezuela in Caracas and continued them in San Marcos University of Lima, where he earned his doctorate. He completed his training in several of the most important European clinics, although it was in Paris (France), with Dr. Louis-Auguste Desmarres, where he truly created the specialty of ophthalmology, being a fellow student of Albrecht von Graefe. During his stay there, he became the head of Dr. Desmarres' ophthalmologic clinic where he demonstrated his skills of his specialization, which led him to become the most brilliant figure in 19th-century Spanish ophthalmology. He also designed various ophtalmologic instruments to facilitate examination and surgical maneuvers in eyes, including a caustic mirror for dacryocystectomy procedures, a spatula needle used to dislocate the cristaline lens prior to corneal incision in cataract surgery, and an eye drop instillation device.

Luis Zambrano (Bailadores, 1901 – Tovar, 1990) was a Venezuelan self-taught inventor and popular technologist. He left formal education after the fourth year of primary school, but soon began to develop an interest in mechanics, enjoying discovering for himself the speed ratios produced by connecting oranges of different diameters and rotating them by means of jets of water. These gadgets lead him to consider new challenges and discover of physical principles in practical ways. In his Valle Nuevo workshop, near Bailadores, he empirically and intuitively learned enough about water turbines to generate electricity and mechanics to allow him to create about 50 inventions, some of which were commissions, such as a strawberry-peeling machine and a sieve for categorising garlic, and numerous improvements to various different machines, despite having lost his right hand to a saw in an accident in 1977. In November 1984, the University of Los Andes awarded him the title of Doctor Honoris Causa "for his useful creative work", the first time that this award had been given to a country man. He was declared an illustrious son of Bailadores, and a street in this Méridan village is now named after him.

Luis Caballero Mejias (Caracas, 1903– Caracas, 1959) was a Venezuelan engineer who invented the Precooked maize flour for the arepas in the 1950s. The traditional preparation of arepa flour is very labor-intensive, requiring the pounding of maize in a large mortar, boiling and grinding. Caballero used the profits from his patent to finance a Technical Schools system. The precooked flour was later mass-produced and sold in larger quantities. In 1954, the Venezuelan beer and malted drinks company Empresas Polar developed an industrial production method, launching the brand Harina P.A.N. in 1960. The product rapidly gained acceptance among housewives because of the tremendous saving in domestic labor and its high quality. The original slogan was "Se acabó la piladera", which means "No more pounding". Harina P.A.N. has remained essentially unchanged since then, as can be seen from the original advertisements.

Humberto Fernández-Morán (Maracaibo, February 18, 1924 – Stockholm, March 17, 1999) was a Venezuelan research scientist, renowned for inventing the diamond knife or scalpel, significantly advancing the development of electromagnetic lenses for electron microscopy based on superconducting technology, and many other scientific contributions. Dr. Fernández-Morán founded the Venezuelan Institute for Neurological and Brain Studies, the predecessor of the current Venezuelan Institute of Scientific Research (IVIC). In 1958 he was appointed Minister of Education during the last year of the regime of Marcos Pérez Jiménez and was forced to leave Venezuela when the dictatorship was overthrown. He worked with NASA for the Apollo Project and taught in many universities, such as Massachusetts Institute of Technology, University of Chicago and the Stockholm University. In the United States he was proposed to be nominated for the Nobel Prize. He rejected the nomination because he would have had to embrace American citizenship, which he refused, wanting to maintain his Venezuelan nationality. Among honors and awards includes the John Scott Medal, Knight of the Order of the Polar Star, Claude Bernard Medal, Cambridge annual Medical Prize.

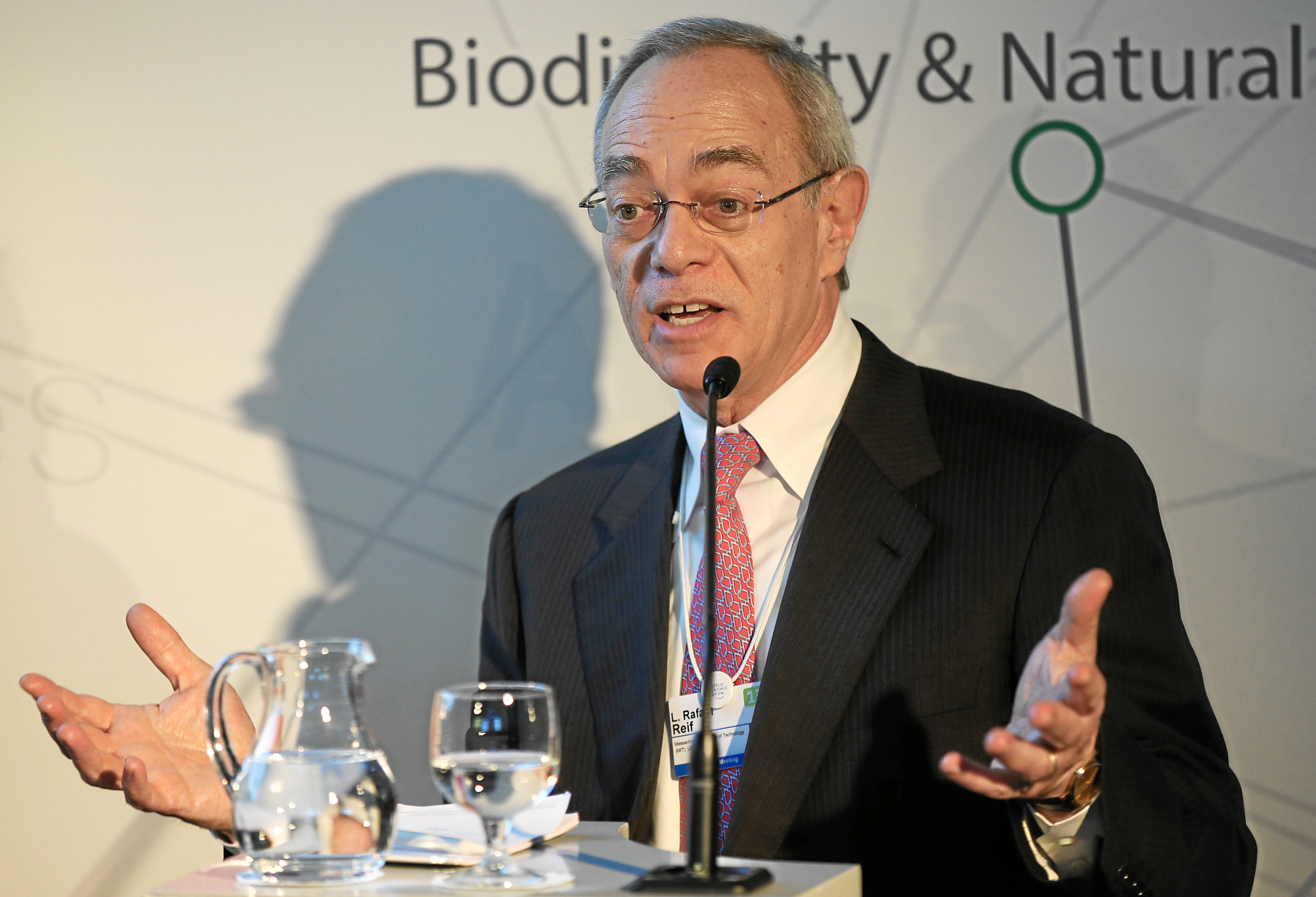
L. Rafael Reif, 17th President of the Massachusetts Institute of Technology

L. Rafael Reif (born in Maracaibo, August 21, 1950). Venezuelan American electrical engineer, inventor and academic administrator. Descendent of Czech Jews ancestor on July 2, 2012, was elected president of the Massachusetts Institute of Technology, succeeding Susan Hockfield the first woman in charge. Reif received his undergraduate degree in electrical engineering from the Universidad de Carabobo, Valencia, Venezuela in 1973. He then served for a year as an assistant professor at Universidad Simón Bolívar in Caracas. He went to the United States for graduate school, earning his doctorate in electrical engineering from Stanford University in 1979. He then spent a year as a visiting assistant professor in the department of electrical engineering at Stanford. His research centered on three-dimensional integrated circuit technologies and on environmentally benign microelectronics fabrication. An early champion of MIT's engagement in micro- and nanotechnologies, Dr. Reif is the inventor or co-inventor on 13 patents, has edited or co-edited five books and has supervised 38 doctoral theses.

Ignacio Layrisse (born in Caracas, 1952). Graduated as chemist at Simon Bolivar University. Engaged by INTEVEP in 1977 led the first investigative sketches referring to heavy oil emulsion-surfactant technology that conducted to the Orimulsion trade mark in 1983. In 1985 managed INTEVEP groups to study the feasibility of using it as fuel for boilers. In 1988 the commercialization of this product was in charge of the company Bitúmenes del Orinoco, S.A. (BITOR), subsidiary of PDVSA. Finally, that same year, the first commercial scale cargo was exported to the Chubuelectric power plant in Japan. The Orimulsion developed by Venezuelans scientist represents one of the most significant inventions of the 20th century. managing director PDVSA until 2002 when migrated to Mexico. In 2005 was chief executive officer of Monclova Pirineos Gas, S.A responsible for the technical activities from the planning phase to construction for the company that was awarded the PEMEX multi services contract of the Pirineo Block. At IHSA realized technical activities from planning phase to execution of Geology, Reservoir, Drilling, Infrastructure, Operational and Maintenance and Health, Security and Environment. For Vetra Exploration and Production Colombia, S.A. since 2013 handle Colombian and Peruvian assets with an operated production of some 200 000 bd of oil and 7 exploratory Blocks.

Manuel Rendon (born in San Cristobal, 1968). Venezuelan chemical engineer graduated at Simon Bolivar University who invented the first published formulation for the degradation of fossil-based high-density plastics. It is composed of heptane, cellulose, methyl rhenium trioxide, butylated hydroxytoluene, and polyphenol oxidase. The additive can be selectively programmed to cause the plastic to begin disintegrating at a predetermined time.

Gabriel A. Rincon-Mora (born in Caracas in 1972) is a Venezuelan-American electrical engineer, scientist, professor, inventor, and author who was elevated to the grade of Fellow by the Institute of Electrical and Electronics Engineers (IEEE) in 2011 and to the grade of Fellow by the Institution of Engineering and Technology (IET) in 2009 for his contributions to energy-harvesting and power-conditioning integrated circuits (ICs). Hispanic Business Magazine voted him one of "The 100 Most Influential Hispanics" in 2000, the Society of Hispanic Professional Engineers (SHPE) awarded him the National Hispanic in Technology Award in 2000, Florida International University (FIU) awarded him the Charles E. Perry Visionary Award in 2000, the Georgia Institute of Technology inducted him into its Council of Outstanding Young Engineering Alumni in 2000, and former lieutenant governor Cruz Bustamante of California presented him a Commendation Certificate in 2001. Rincón-Mora grew up in Maracay, and migrated to the United States when he was 11 years old. He graduated at Florida International University as Electrical Engineer in 1992, Georgia Tech with a Master of Science degree in electrical engineering with a minor in mathematics in 1994, and Georgia Tech with a PhD in electrical engineering in 1996 with a dissertation on "Current Efficient, Low Voltage, Low Dropout Regulators" (Advisor: Prof. Phil Allen). He worked for Texas Instruments from 1994 to 2003, was an adjunct professor for the School of Electrical and Computer Engineering at Georgia Tech (1999–2001), professor at Georgia Tech since 2001 and visiting professor at National Cheng Kung University (NCKU) in Taiwan since 2011. He has written several books, chapters of others, and over 160 other publications. His work has generated 38 patents. He has designed over 26 commercial power-chip designs and delivered over 95 presentations worldwide. as of October 2014 his publications had been cited over 5200 times. His work and research is on the design and development of silicon-based microsystems that draw and condition power from tiny batteries, fuel cells, and generators that harness ambient energy from motion, light, temperature, and radiation to supply mobile, portable, and self-sustaining devices such as wireless microsensors for biomedical, consumer, industrial, and military applications. He has worked on voltage references, low-dropout regulators, switching dc–dc converters, and energy-harvesting microsystems.

== Mathematics ==
=== Calculus ===
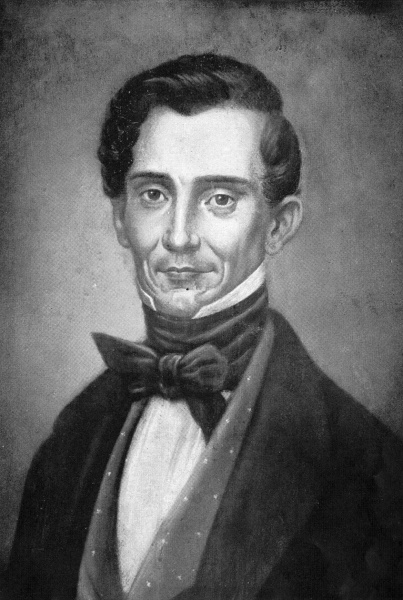
Juan Manuel Cajigal y Odoardo

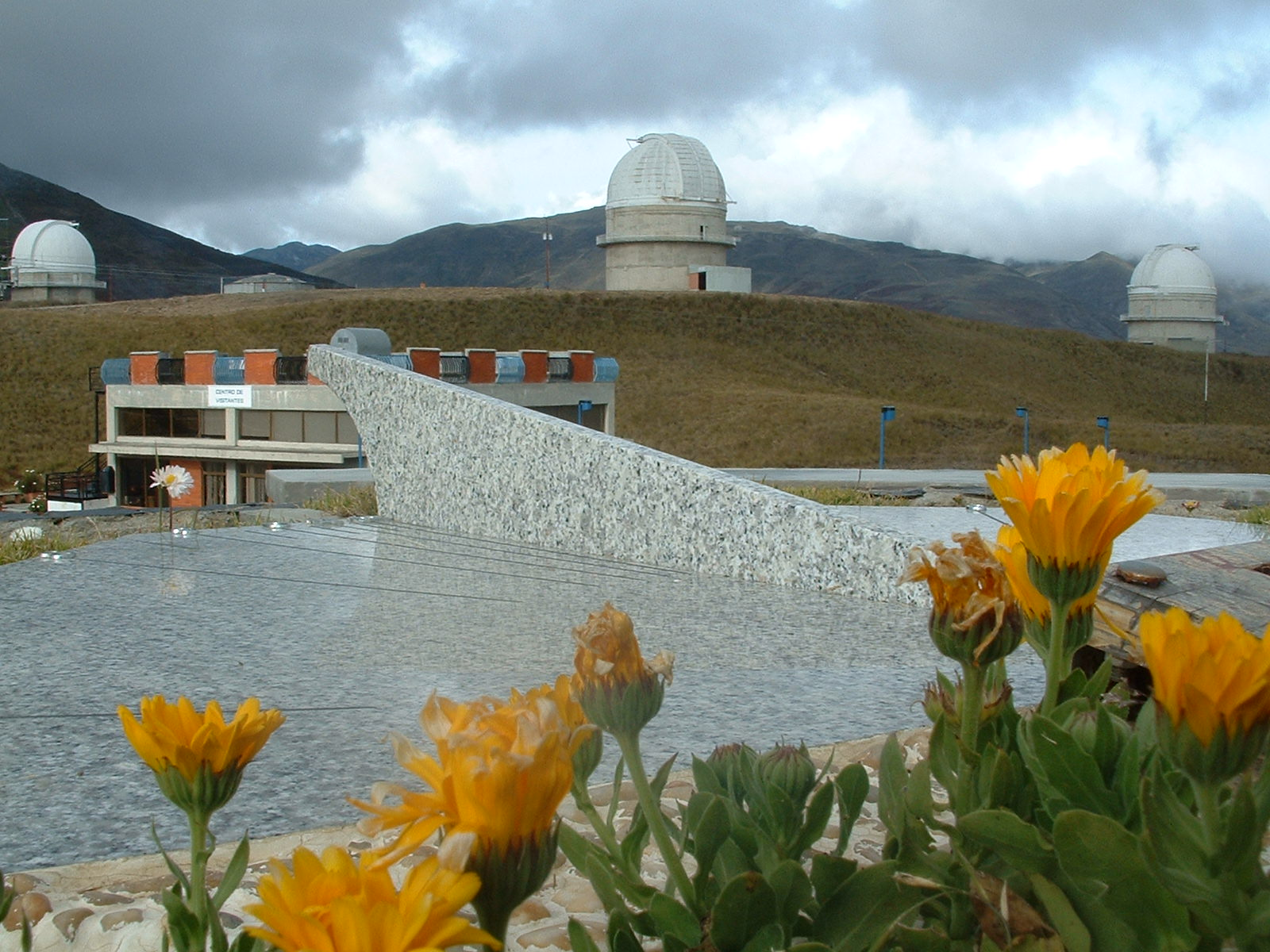
Francisco J. Duarte National Astronomical Observatory

Juan Manuel Cajigal y Odoardo (Barcelona, 1803 – Yaguaraparo, 1856) was a Venezuelan mathematician, engineer and statesman. Orphaned at age 7, he was raised in Spain by his cousin-once-removed, Field Marshal Juan Manuel Cajigal, former captain general of Venezuela and Cuba. He studied in the University of Alcalá de Henares and later in France, finishing his studies in 1828. He returned to Venezuela that year. He helped found the Sociedad Económica de Amigos del País the following year, and in 1830 the government appointed him to create and direct the new Military Academy of Mathematics. He served on National Congress twice, once in 1833 as representative of Caracas, and in 1835 as senator of Barcelona Province. With José Hermenegildo García and Fermín Toro he founded the newspaper Correo de Caracas, which ran from 1838 to 1841. His works include Tratado de mecánica elemental ("Treatise on Fundamental Mechanics") and Curso de astronomía y memorias sobre integrales entre límites ("Course on Astronomy and Report on Integrals between Limits"). The Juan Manuel Cajigal Naval Observatory in the 23 de Enero of Caracas (Metro Station: Caño Amarillo), Juan Manuel Cajigal Municipality in Anzoátegui, and asteroid (minor planet) 12359 Cajigal are named after him.

Francisco J. Duarte (Maracaibo 1883 – Caracas 1972) Engineer and mathematician. He obtained in 1900, the title of bachelor and surveyor in Puerto Cabello. In 1902 with only 19 old he dedicated to study of mathematics, doing a work on the sign π up to 200 decimal digits, presented to the Academy of Sciences of Paris in 1907. Graduated in 1908 in the Central University of Venezuela as civil engineer, later served as professor of geometry (1909–1911) and infinitesimal calculus (1936–1939). He studied mathematics at the University of Paris (1920). He was the consul of Venezuela in Geneva (1924–1929), director of the Astronomical and Meteorological Observatory Juan Manuel Cajigal (1936–1941). He also served for many years as border director of the Ministry of Foreign Affairs (1941–1968), a position that allowed him to participate in the delimitation of Venezuelan borders with neighboring countries, particularly Brazil. He chaired the College of Engineers (1937–1939) and the Academy of Physical, Mathematical, and Natural Sciences (1941–1945 and 1954–1957) of which he had been a founding member (1933). Throughout his life he maintained a permanent correspondence with scientists from around the world on problems inherent to his specialty and has been considered as one of the most outstanding mathematicians of his time. The National Astronomical Observatory of Llano del Hato are named after him.

Raimundo Chela (Carupano 1919-Caracas, 1965) Mathematician of Lebanese family. Graduated as professor of mathematics in the Pedagogical Institute, he worked there uninterruptedly for 16 years between 1942 and 1958. In the Central University of Venezuela founded the Faculty of Sciences in 1959 and was in charge of the school of mathematics. In 1961 he was the first recipient of the Council of Scientific and Humanistic Development of the Central University of Venezuela to study postgraduate studies at King's College in London, where he obtained his doctorate in mathematics in 1963. He was a founding member of the Teachers' Association of Venezuela, where he held the presidency of the organization on two occasions, from 1952 to 1953 and from 1963 to 1965. He was also a corresponding member of the Academy of Physical, Mathematical and Natural Sciences. Due to his extensive performance in the chair, he formed several generations of students in his specialty and was considered one of the most outstanding mathematicians in Latin America.

Ignacio Irribarren (born in Caracas in 1945). Graduated in mathematics at the University of Oxford during the 1960s. He began his professorial career more than forty years ago in the Faculty of Engineering of the Central University of Venezuela, where he won the chair of Mathematical Analysis by Competition. He is professor (founder) of Simón Bolívar University (USB), where he held the positions of chief (founder) of the department of mathematics, director (founder) of the Division of Physics and Mathematics and vice rector academic. Retired from USB since 1989. He was a senior member of CONICIT (National Council for Scientific and Technological Research) for nineteen years (until 1994) and served as vice president of CONICIT for four years. President (1990–93) of the board of directors of the Fund for the Promotion of Researchers; member of the National Council of Education (1989–94); member of the Presidential Commission for the Study of a National Educational Project (COPEN) (1985–86). Visiting professor at the University of Oxford (1982). Rector of the Metropolitan University (1985–94). Since 1986 he has occupied the XVII chair as Number Individual of the Academy of Physical, Mathematical and Natural Sciences. He held the presidency of the academy for the periods: 1997–1999 and 1999–2001. Among his mathematical publications are : 'Topology of Metric Spaces' (Limusa-Wiley, Mexico); 'Differential Calculation in Normalized Spaces' (Equinox, USB); 'Measures and Integrals' (CFMN Academy); 'A second course of integration / The integral of Henstock-Kurzweil' (Equinox, USB); 'Linear Algebra' (Equinox – ACFIMAN); 'Bodies and Theory of Galois' (Equinox – ACFIMAN).

Pedro Berrizbeitia (born in Caracas on December 11, 1959). He received his bachelor's degree in mathematics from Simón Bolívar University in 1981 and his doctorate from the Massachusetts Institute of Technology in 1986. He is Professor of the Department of Pure Mathematics And Applied Sciences of the Simón Bolívar University. Berrizbeitia's works cover a wide range of mathematical topics, from algebra to graph theories, but his most compelling contributions are those dealing with the additive theory of numbers and the theory of proofs of primality. He has published 17 scientific articles in prestigious international journals in the field of Mathematics and two monographs on proofs of primality and number theory. He has been a visiting professor at universities in the United States and Spain and has been a guest lecturer on ten occasions, by universities and research centers in those countries, in addition to Uruguay and Chile, and has also given twelve invited conferences at various events in Venezuela. He has conducted six master's theses in Mathematics and received Honorable Mention for the best scientific work awarded by CONICIT in 1992. He is a reviewer of the important international publication "Mathematical Reviews" and member of the System of Promotion to the Researcher, Level II.

== Medicine ==
=== Experimental medicine ===
Saint José Gregorio Hernández (Isnotu, 1858-Caracas, 1919). Graduated as a medical doctor at Universidad Central de Venezuela was noted both for his pioneering in biochemistry and for his piety. The Venezuelan government awarded him a grant to continue his studies in Europe. Hernández traveled to Paris, France, where he studied other fields of medicine such as: bacteriology, pathology, microbiology, histology, and physiology. Following his return to Venezuela, he became a leading doctor at the Hospital José María Vargas. Between 1891 and 1916, Hernández dedicated himself to teaching, medicine, and religious practice. He sought priesthood in two occasions, but his fragile physical conditions would ultimately prevent him from achieving that status. He studied at the Monastery of Lucca in Italy for ten months in 1908. In 1913, he enrolled at the Latin American Pío School of Rome to continue the priestly career, but had to return to Venezuela for health reasons. Among the scientific publications of this famous Venezuelan are The Elements of Bacteriology (1906), About the Angina Pectoris of Malaric Origin (1909) and The Elements of Philosophy (1912). Dr. Hernández treated the poor for free and even bought them medicines with his own money. One day in 1919, while bringing medicine to the home of one of his patients in Caracas, Hernández was struck by a car and killed. In 1986 the Pope John Paul II solemnly declared his heroic virtues, for which he was granted the title of Venerable. After more than 80 years of investigating the first miracle that Hernández did, on 30 April 2021, was beatified by Pope Francis, who later approved his canonization in early 2025. He was canonized by Pope Leo XIV on 19 October 2025, one of the first two citizens of Venezuela to be so recognized by the Catholic Church. In January 2026 Pope Leo XIV sought his intercession following the US raid on Venezuela.was beatified in Caracas, Venezuela.

August Pi i Sunyer (Barcelona 1879 – Ciudad de Mexico, 1965). Graduate in medicine at the University of Barcelona in 1899 gained a doctorate at the University of Madrid in 1900 with a thesis on anaerobic life. He worked as an assistant professor of physiology in Barcelona in 1902 under Ramon Coll i Pujol, and in 1904 obtained the chair in the University of Seville. In 1906 he presided over the executive committee of the First Congress of Hygiene of Catalonia and in 1907 resigned to the chair to return to Barcelona to dedicate itself to the investigation. In 1914 was named professor of physiology of the Faculty of Medicine of the University of Barcelona, of which in 1916 happened to be full professor.

From then until he went into exile he devoted himself to medicine. He created a physiological research center in the Barcelona Municipal Laboratory, led by Ramon Turro i Darder, who was his friend and considered himself a disciple. From his experiments with animals he made various discoveries about reflexes, physical stimuli, and their influence on respiration. In 1920 he went to direct the Institute of Physiology of the Commonwealth, where he created a school of certain international prestige. In 1912 he founded the Catalan Society of Biology, was president of the Barcelona Royal Academy of Medicine between 1926 and 1939 and was director of the publication Treballs de la Societat de Biologia (1913–1938), where he published most of his works.

After the outbreak of the Spanish Civil War, in 1939 he was exiled with his family to Paris and from there to Caracas, after receiving an invitation from the Venezuelan government to work as professor of physiology in the faculty of medicine of the Central University of Venezuela in 1940. He also directed the Institute of Experimental Medicine, where he formed a school of physiology like that of Barcelona. From 1946 he worked as a professor of biochemistry and, since 1942, as professor of biology and biochemistry at the National Pedagogical Institute of Caracas. In 1955 nationalizated as Venezuelan Pi Sunier wrote in Caracas ten books and two novels, apart from the essays and monographs collected in scientific journals and in cultural publications, which is an inventory of great value that earned him the Kalinga Prize, granted by UNESCO in 1955.

Francisco De Venanzi (Caracas, March 12, 1917 – Caracas, September 12, 1987) was a Venezuelan doctor, scientist and academic descendant of Italian immigrants. Graduated at the Central University of Venezuela in 1942, completed a master's degree in biochemistry at Yale University in 1945. He became a professor in the Faculty of Medicine of the Central University of Venezuela, first in physiology, then in pathology and later in pathophysiology. Like other professors, he resigned in 1951 in protest at decree 321 of the military junta, which ended the autonomy of the university. In 1950 De Venanzi founded the Venezuelan Association for the Advancement of Science (AsoVAC) which publishes the journal Acta Científica Venezolana. In 1951, with Marcel Roche and other scientists, founded the Institute of Medical Research of the Luis Roche Foundation. At the fall of the military government in 1958, Francisco de Venanzi is appointed president of the governing body at UCV, where he favors the return of professors retired from the university during the political crisis of 1952 and helps to establish the new university law. He was elected rector from January 7, 1959, a post he held until 1963. Besides being a tireless experimenter who published numerous reports in international journals such as Acta Physiologica Latinoamericana and Acta Científica Venezolana, Francisco De Venanzi was a passionate promoter of knowledge, culture and political pluralism. He founded several important initiatives for local science progress, remaining active until his later years, despite the slowly progressing disability which undermined his physical health. memories of the Venezuelan Institute for Scientific Research.

=== Internal medicine ===
Marcel Roche (Caracas, August 15, 1920 – Miami, May 3, 2003) was a physician, researcher and scientific leader. Graduated in medicine at Johns Hopkins Medical School, in Baltimore in 1946, he specialized in endocrinology and nuclear medicine. Before returning to Venezuela in 1951, he carried out biomedical research for some time at the New York Institute of Public Health. In Venezuela, Dr. Roche started several pioneering works as an assistant professor of the Central University of Venezuela on goitre, hookworm infections and nutritional deficiencies and anaemias, especially among the poor and aboriginal people. He was founder and director of the Institute of Medical Research at the Central University, and in 1958 he also became the secretary general of the Venezuelan Association for the Advancement of Science (AsoVAC). Other institutions directed by him were the Institute of Neurology and Brain Investigation, reorganized by him in 1959 as the Venezuelan Institute for Scientific Research (IVIC). He was founder and director of the Venezuelan National Council of Scientific Investigation and the magazine Intersciencia, as well as being involved in the publishing of several other scientific periodicals. Dr. Roche was also a pioneer in the area of public understanding of science and a pioneer in the production of TV programs and documentary films on many science subjects. He was very active in promoting science to the public and participated in many national and international organizations promoting science. Dr. Roche was an advisor of the WHO and UNESCO as Governor of the International Atomic Energy Agency (1958–1960), president of the council of the University of the United Nations in Tokyo, and Secretary of the Third World Academy of Sciences. He received many honours and degrees from Belgium, Germany, France, the United States, India and Brazil. He won the Kalinga Prize in 1987 from UNESCO for his work.

Fuad Lechin (born in Caracas, August 8, 1928) Graduated as Physician at Central University of Venezuela (UCV) in 1951 with specialization in Internal Medicine and Gastroenterology. Chief of the Sections of Neuropharmacology, Neurochemistry and Stress, Institute of Experimental Medicine of Central University of Venezuela. President of the Venezuelan Society of Clinical Pharmacology and Therapeutics. He has published more than 240 papers on results of clinical, physiological, pharmacological and psychiatric research carried out by his team and is today a reviewer for several American and European scientific journals. He has addressed national and international scientific congresses on Gastroenterology, physiology, pharmacology, psychosomatic, psychiatry, and psychoneuroendocrinology. Conferencist by invitation to the research units of pharmaceutical companies such as Sandoz (Basel), Lilly (Indianapolis), Janssen (Belgium), and Bristol (New York). In 2001 Dr. Lechin has been nominated for the Nobel Prize of Medicine based on the new treatment of bronchial asthma and myasthenia gravis developed and published by his research group. Emeritus Professor of General Pathology and Physiopathology at the Faculty of Medicine, Central University of Venezuela.

=== Surgery ===
José María Vargas (La Guaira, March 10, 1786 – New York City, April 13, 1854) graduated with a degree in philosophy from the Seminario Tridentino obtained in 1809 his medical title from the Real y Pontificia Universidad de Caracas. Vargas was imprisoned by the Spanish in 1813 for revolutionary activities. Upon his release in 1813, he travelled to Scotland for medical training in the University of Edinburgh. Vargas performed cataract surgery. He was one of the earliest eye surgeons in Puerto Rico after his arrival there in 1817. He returned to Venezuela to practice medicine and surgery in 1825. Elected as President of Venezuela in 1834 he resigned his charge in 1836. In 1839 Vargas receives from the President Paez office, an oil sample found in Pedernales, located in the Canton of the Lower Orinoco. He submits it to various physical-chemical analyzes involved the fractional distillation and wrote a much more complete report than the "Silliman Report" which was written 16 years later and which nevertheless appears in texts, as the first scientific report on oil. His final paragraph confirms the wisdom of Vargas: "this finding is more precious and worthy of congratulation than that of the mines of silver and gold." It amazes that such phrase was written decades before the invention of the engine to explosion that uses petroleum derivates to move all the cars and airplanes in the 20th century." Likewise, he continued to give his anatomy and surgery classes at the University, and in 1842 founded the Chair of Chemistry. In 1877, his ashes were brought to Caracas and buried in the National Pantheon on April 27 of that same year.

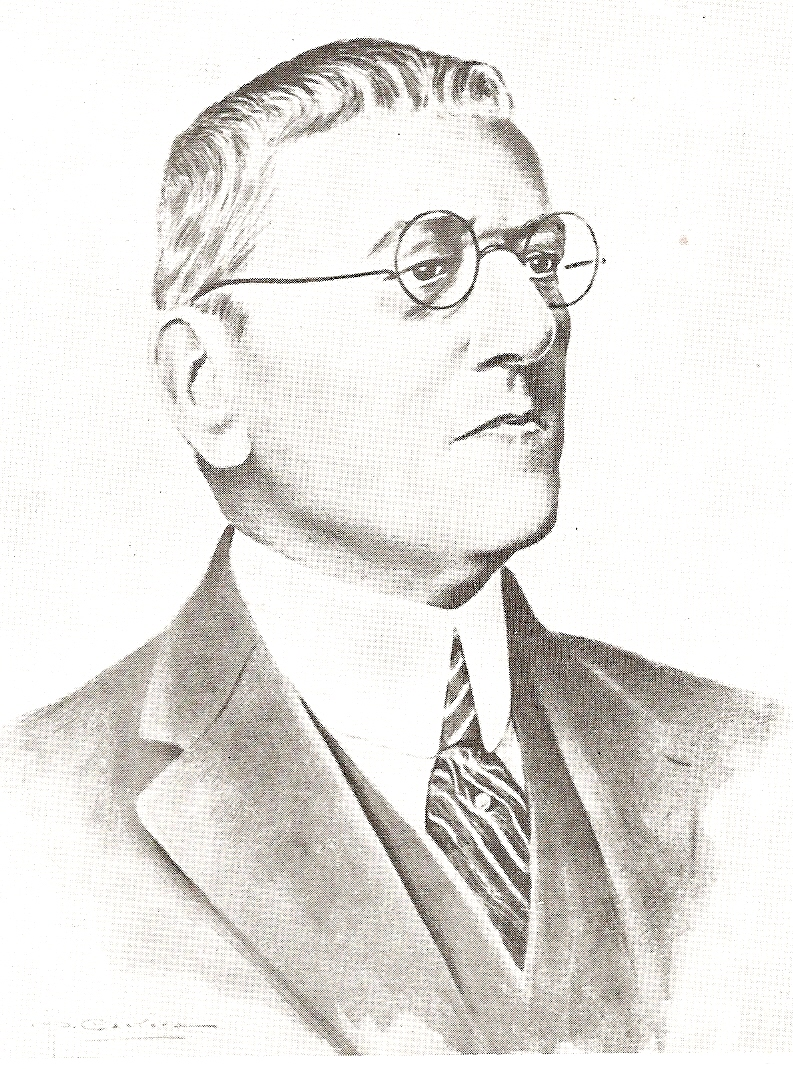
Luis Razetti

Luis Razetti (Caracas, September 10, 1862 – May 14, 1932) was a surgeon who supported and managed a number of advances in the progress of Venezuelan medicine. He is considered the driving-force in the "Renaissance of the Venezuelan medicine", concerning education, research centers and medical practices in Venezuela. One of the two schools of Medicine of the Central University of Venezuela bears his name.

Razetti gained his doctorate in medicine from the Central University of Venezuela (August 4, 1884), to a month to turn 22 years old. So, a few days later traveled to the countryside, where he played his first professional years, particularly in the states Lara, Zulia and the Andes, back to Caracas after 5 years (1884 / 1889). In 1890 he moved to Paris, where he made his postgraduate studies (1890 / 1893), specializing in surgery and Obstetrics. The influence of the French school, dominant then, made a deep and lasting impression on his mind, although he continued to draw on other sources, which is evident in his admiration for Santiago Ramón y Cajal, Charles Darwin and Ernst Haeckel. Among his most notable contributions may mention, in chronological order as follows:

- The founding of the Society of Physicians and Surgeons of Caracas (1893).
- The establishment of clinical teaching in the Central University of Venezuela.
- The establishment of the contests of internship and externship hospitals (1895).
- The reform of the chairs of Anatomy and Operative Medicine (1895 / 1896).
- The founding of the College of Physicians of Venezuela (1902).
- The foundation of the National Academy of Medicine (1904), which was permanent secretary.
- The creation of the Venezuelan Congress of Medicine (1911).

Miguel Pérez Carreño (Valencia, 1904– Caracas, 1966) was a physician, researcher, scientist, university professor and writer. He graduated with a bachelor's degree from the Central University of Venezuela with his thesis called Calor animal (Animal heat). In 1920 he re-entered the university to study medicine and before graduating he worked as a clinical monitor. He earned a PhD in Medical Sciences in October 1926 with the presentation of the thesis Autoseroterapia de los derrames (Auto-serum therapy of effusions) and then devoted himself largely as a teacher. Between 1933 and 1934 he completed his academic training at hospitals of New York City, Paris and Vienna. He considered diagnosis an art that had to be accomplished not only through clinical history, but through long, sustained, conversation with the patient about their health problems and living conditions. Beginning in 1936, he worked on the study, analysis and evaluation of definitive treatment for surgical diseases. In Venezuela he did a series of interventions including pasacro nerve resection in the treatment of pelvic neuralgia, resection of the rectum with contra natura permanent anum, (1932), ovarian homografts (1936), the new technique of lymphatic blockade in infectious processes, carried out with electrosurgery linked with sulfonamide therapy (1938), the radical cure of rectal prolapse with fascia lata (aponeurosis of the thigh) ligation of the femoral artery by gangrene and embolectomy by phlebitis. He also contributed to improving the treatment of Banti syndrome (abnormal growth of the spleen) and portal hypertension (usually caused by liver cirrhosis). Active in the Caracas Polyclinic, the José María Vargas Hospital and the University Hospital, Perez-Carreño was head of descriptive practical anatomy procedures, head of surgical medicine, chief of clinical surgery and dean of the Faculty of Medicine, among other duties. He spent part of his last years on cancer research. The hospital belonging to the National Institute of Social Security, located to the west of Caracas, bears his name.

Rene Sotelo (Caracas 1961) is an experienced laparoscopic/robotic surgeon. He received his medical degree from Central University of Venezuela and has practiced medicine for more than 20 years in Venezuela and Mexico. Sotelo pioneered robotic surgery for complex urinary fistulae in females and males, benign prostate enlargement and inguinal lymph node dissection for cancer. He has helped develop surgical precedures that use natural orifices, such as the belly-button. He also serves on the editorial board of three urologic journals. Sotelo is part of the USC Keck School of Medicine.

== Physics ==
=== Astrophysics ===
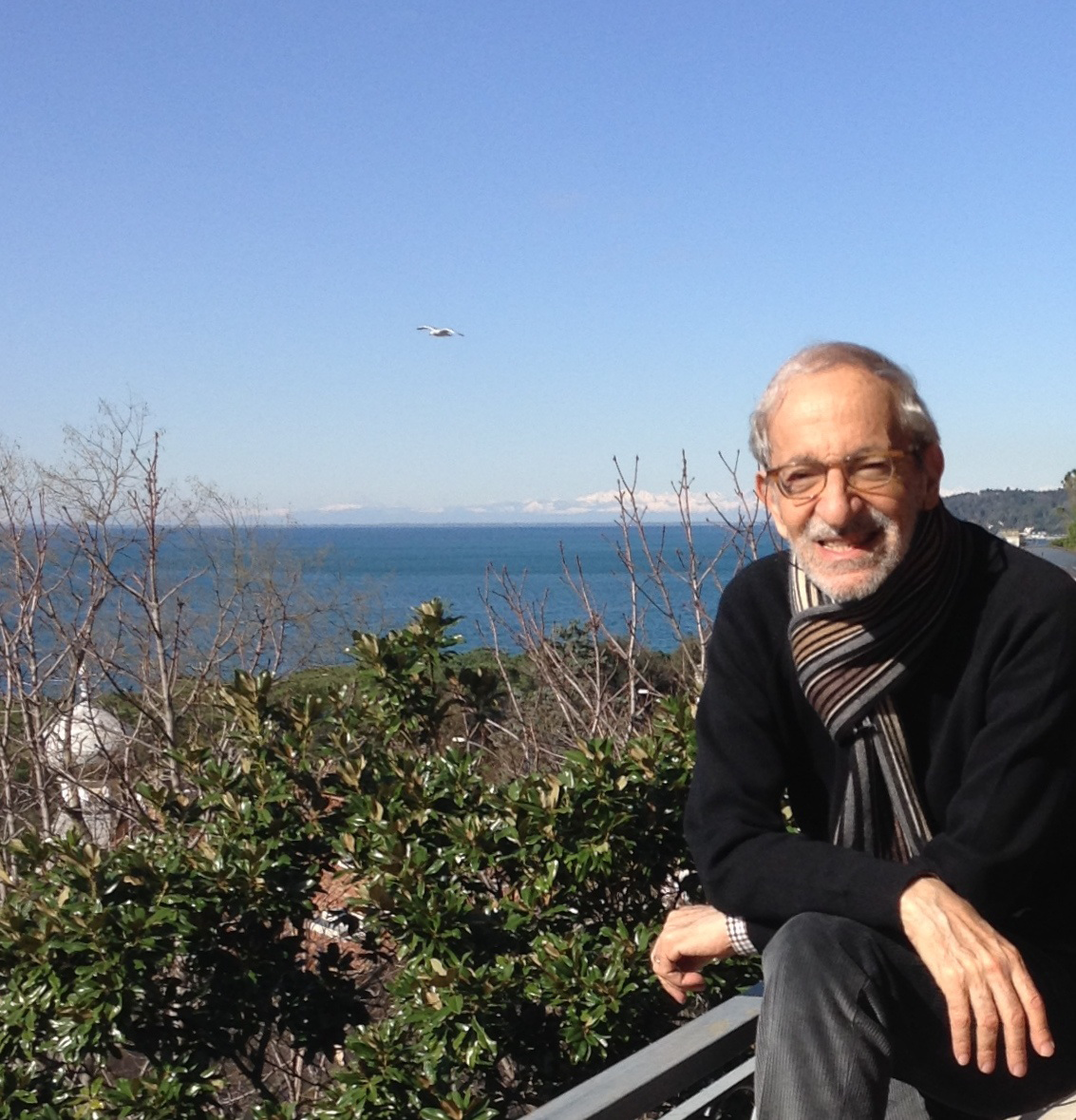
Julian Chela-Flores at ICTP of Trieste (Italy)

Julian Chela-Flores (born June 13, 1942, in Caracas). Astrobiologist and physicist known for his contributions to the field of planetary habitability. He lived in England, where he studied in the University of London, obtaining a PhD in quantum mechanics in 1969. From 1971 till 1990 he worked in academic matters continually, especially in research at the Centre of Physics, the Venezuelan Institute for Scientific Research (Full Researcher 1978) and at the physics department, Simon Bolivar University (full professor 1980), both in Caracas. He is full professor ad honorem at the Institute for Advanced Studies (IDEA, Caracas) having been a co-founder of IDEA in 1980. Since 1994 he is an associate member of the Dublin Institute for Advanced Studies and International Centre for Theoretical Physics(ITCP) in Trieste. His field of research is astrobiology, in other words the science of the origin, evolution, distribution and destiny of life in the universe, especially life on Europa, the Jovian satellite.

Humberto Campins (born in Barquisimeto, 1946) is an international expert on asteroids and comets. He attended the University of Kansas, where he earned a bachelor's degree in astronomy. He went onto the University of Arizona, where he earned a PhD in planetary sciences. As a graduate student he was named a representative to the Committee for Peaceful Uses of Outer Space of the General Assembly of the United Nations. He conducts research at observatories around the world, including Arizona, Chile, France, Hawaii, Spain and the Vatican. In 2010 he discovered water ice and organic molecules on the asteroid 24 Themis and later on 65 Cybele adding weight to the growing theory that Earth's water may have come from asteroids. His expertise have landed him on NASA and European Space Agency teams preparing interplanetary vehicles that will launch in the coming few years, including the OSIRIS-REx project and the Marco Polo-R mission. Since 2002 worked at the University of Central Florida and University of Arizona. He has earned several prestigious awards including a Fulbright and the Don Quijote Award. The asteroid, 3327 Campins, was named after him.

Gustavo Bruzual (born in Caracas, August 2, 1949). Astronomer and PhD degree in 1981 from the University of California, Berkeley. His thesis versed on Spectral Evolution of Galaxies. Then after he joined the staff at Centro de Investigaciones de Astronomía (CIDA) in Mérida, Venezuela, where he served for more than 30 years, including 21 years as director of the center. His research is centered on evolutionary population synthesis and modeling the spectral evolution of galaxies. His work in collaboration with S. Charlot (IAP, France) has become a landmark in the field. Their three papers together have received over 6200 citations. The Bruzual and Charlot (2003) models have proven very useful in deriving the physical properties of galaxies of different types observed in large galaxy surveys like the SDSS, allowing to characterize galaxies at various redshifts as belonging to the red sequence or the blue cloud, and providing an estimate of the stellar mass and its growth rate, in these systems. Currently G. Bruzual is working on improving different aspects of stellar population synthesis, like the treatment of TP-AGB and WR stars in spectral evolution models. Actually is investigador Titular at the Centro de Radioastronomía y Astrofísica (CryA) in the Morelia Campus of the Universidad Nacional Autónoma de México (UNAM) and professor at the UNAM Graduate Program in Astrophysics.

=== Particle physics ===
Anamaría Font Villaroel (born in Anaco, 1959) is a Venezuelan born theoretical physicist. Her research has been focused on models about the primordial components of matter in the context of string theory. Font has contributed to development of Calabi–Yau dimensional compactification and introduced the concept of S-duality to superstring theory, contributing to the second superstring revolution. Anamaría Font obtained her bachelor's degree in physics, Cum Laude in 1980 from Simon Bolivar University and received a PhD from the University of Texas in 1987, with a thesis titled "Four-Dimensional Supergravity Theories Arising from Superstrings". Her article titled "Strong-weak coupling duality and non-perturbative effects in string theory"] had a big influence in the second superstring revolution in 1995. It was in this article where the term S-duality was first used in this context. In 2013, Font was elected a fellow of The World Academy of Sciences (TWAS) for the advancement of science in developing countries. Font has been actively involved in projects related to education in physics and mathematics in Venezuela and other countries. In July 2018, Physics Today magazine published an interview with Font about the status of science in Venezuela. The publication data base INSPIRE-HEP included three of her notorious publications into their data base.] She is a member of the Organization for Women in Science for the Developing World (OWSD) and is research associate of the Severo Ochoa IFT (Instituto de Física Teórica). In 1991, Font was awarded the Lorenzo Mendoza Fleury Science Prize. In 1998, she was awarded, jointly with Fernando Quevedo, the ICTP Prize in the field of High Energy Physics (in honour of Chen Ning Yang). In 2023, was honored with the L'Oréal-UNESCO For Women in Physics Award recognized for her important contributions in theoretical particle physics, in particular to the study of String Theory. Her research has furthered the theory's implications for the structure of matter and quantum gravity, which is also relevant to the description of black holes and the first instants after the Big bang theory.

Mayly Sánchez (born in Caracas, 1972) Venezuelan-born particle physicist who researches at Iowa State University. In 2011, she was awarded the Presidential Early Career Awards for Scientists and Engineers (PECASE), the highest honor given by the United States to beginning scientists, who are in the early stages of their research careers. In 2013, she was named by the BBC as one of the top ten women scientists in Latin America. At Universidad de Los Andes, ULA in Mérida completed an undergraduate degree in physics in 1995, and won a scholarship for postgraduate work at the International Centre for Theoretical Physics in Trieste, Italy. Earning her diploma in high energy physics in 1996, she was accepted into a doctoral program at Tufts University outside of Boston, Massachusetts and completed her PhD in 2003. After graduation, Sánchez worked as postdoctoral researcher at Harvard University. In 2007 she was hired as assistant physicist at the US Energy Department's Argonne National Laboratory. In 2009 she joined the faculty of Iowa State University, where she is now an associate professor of physics and astronomy and Cassling Family Professor. Her research is part of the Long Baseline Neutrino Experiment (DUNE), which is planned to send an intense beam of neutrinos from the Fermi National Accelerator Laboratory in Batavia, Illinois to a detector located at the Homestake Mine in South Dakota. The experiment is designed to help scientists understand how the universe formed and why neutrinos change form, especially when they pass through rock. Sánchez is also working on the Main Injector Neutrino Oscillation Search and NOνA experiments designed to study neutrino oscillations sent from Fermilab detectors in northern Minnesota, and she is a spokesperson of the Accelerator Neutrino Neutron Interaction Experiment (ANNIE) at Fermilab. In 2012, the White House announced that Sánchez was one of the 2011 PECASE Award winners, which is the highest award granted by the United States to young scientists beginning their careers. In 2013, she was named by the BBC as one of the top ten women scientists in Latin America.

=== Theoretical physics ===
Luis Herrera Cometta (born December 20, 1946) is a Venezuelan relativity physicist, whose research focuses on the study of anisotropy, the extended thermodynamics, exact and semi numeric solutions, axial symmetric solutions, alternative approaches to detect gravitational radiation using gyroscopes and recently about the relevance of super energy and super Poynting in General Relativity. Herrera is emeritus professor in the Escuela de Física at Universidad Central de Venezuela and currently is visiting professor at the Instituto Universitario de Fisica Fundamental y Matematicas, Universidad de Salamanca, Spain. He helped to found the Relativity and Fields Seminar at Universidad Simón Bolívar. He is considered an authority in anisotropic effects on gravitational collapse; he is a pioneer in the heritage of symmetries within General Relativity and in the application of Extended Thermodynamics for Astrophysical scenarios. Herrera is known for semi numerical approaches to self gravitating objects, later interpreted as the Post-Quasistatic-Approximation, with a wide applications spectrum in Relativistic Astrophysics and basically in the spherical context. Recently (2011) he won a Honorific Mention for his essay on the meaning of general covariance and the relevance of observers in general relativity.

Freddy Cachazo is a Venezuelan-born theoretical physicist. After graduating from Simón Bolívar University in 1996, attended a year-long Postgraduate Diploma Programme at the International Centre for Theoretical Physics (ICTP) in Trieste, Italy. He was admitted in Harvard University, where he completed the Ph.D. under the supervision of Cumrun Vafa in 2002. who holds the Gluskin Sheff Freeman Dyson Chair in Theoretical Physics at the Perimeter Institute for Theoretical Physics in Waterloo, Ontario, Canada.

He is known for the contributions to quantum field theory through the study of scattering amplitudes, in particular in quantum chromodynamics, N = 4 supersymmetric Yang–Mills theory and quantum gravity. His contributions include BCFW recursion relations, the CSW vertex expansion and the amplituhedron. In 2014, Cachazo was awarded the New Horizons Prize for uncovering numerous structures underlying scattering amplitudes in gauge theories and gravity.

== Social sciences ==
=== Education ===
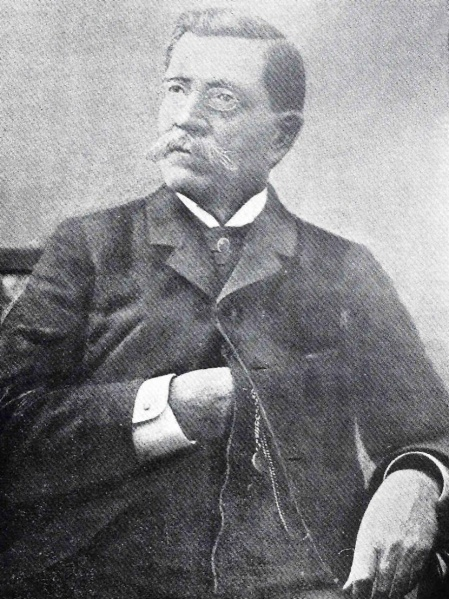
Adolf Ernst

Adolf Ernst (Primkenau, Silesia, Kingdom of Prussia, (today Przemków, Poland) October 6, 1832 – Caracas, Venezuela, August 12, 1899) was a Prussian-born scientist. Ernst settled in Venezuela in 1861, where he taught at the Universidad Central de Venezuela. He became the most important scientist in the country during the second half of the 19th century and was a key figure in the creation of the Museum of Natural Science and the National Library of Venezuela, where he also served as its director. He developed important scientific works in botany, zoology and ethnography. He also did work in geography, geology, language, anthropology, physics, paleontology and archeology. He is regarded as the founder of the Venezuelan positivist school and marked influence on generations of scientists in Venezuela. One of Adolf Ernst's main merits was his disclosing Venezuelan material to the international scientific societies of the nineteenth century, and publishing their contributions in journals such as Globus, Zeitschrift für Ethnologie, American Anthropologist and in the Bulletin de la Société du Anthropologie Paris.

Luis Alberto Machado (Caracas, January 21, 1932 – Caracas, February 23, 2016) Venezuelan lawyer, author and politician. He was best known for his ideas about the malleability of intelligence. He asserted, in his books and writings on the subject, that perceived limits on intelligence are false and are primarily tied to upbringing and social conditioning. He argued that through careful environmental stimulation, especially in the early stages of child development, intelligence can be developed indefinitely and exponentially throughout life. As a politician, he stated that a nation's collective intellectual power was its greatest asset. The president Luis Herrera Campins (1979–1984) appointed him as Minister of Intellectual Development, a cabinet post created specifically for advancing and applying his ideas with government backing. This program was known as the Intelligence Project, and, although given a small budget, resulted in a number of public initiatives aimed at improving educational opportunities in Venezuela. The project was ended in 1984 by president Jaime Lusinchi, but left behind a legacy in authors related to intelligence as Edward De Bono, Martin Seligman, Howard Gardner and Robert Sternberg. His experience has been developed in Mexico, China, Israel and South Africa.

=== Sociology ===
Lisandro Alvarado (El Tocuyo, Lara State, September 19, 1858 – Valencia, Carabobo state, April 10, 1929). Venezuelan physician, naturalist, historian, linguist and philologist. This eminent scientist overcome his poverty and, in 1888, managed to graduate of doctor in the Central University of Venezuela. He then began a professional career that would lead him to practice medicine and philanthropy in all regions of Venezuela. He conducts studies on folklore, ethnography, zoology, botany and linguistics. Lisandro Alvarado produced a copious printed work that includes twenty-four books and numerous essays. Among the first are "Ideas on the evolution of Spanish in Venezuela", "Glossary of indigenous voices", "Phonetic alterations of Spanish in Venezuela", "Neurosis of famous men", "History of the Federal Revolution in Venezuela" and "Crimes politicians of our history." Also translated seven of the nine volumes referred to Venezuela from Alejandro de Humboldt's "Journey to the Equinoctial Regions of the New Continent" into Spanish, from his original language. He was a fervent disciple of the positivism sponsored in Venezuela by Dr. Adolf Ernst, he belonged to the Academies of Medicine, History and Language and was a corresponding member of numerous foreign scientific corporations. The National Academy of History holds in custody an unpublished collection of his manuscripts.

Maria Elena Marroco Valero (born in Valencia, Spain, April 17, 1938). Social scientist specializing in the learning of Organizational Change. Professional musician of the conservatory of Valencia (1960). Graduate in Education (1978) and Doctor in Social Sciences (1996) at the Central University of Venezuela. Its main contribution to education and the productive world is to maintain a line of research in social sciences, from 1969 to the present, aimed at decoding change in organizations as social cells, resulting in their theory of learning organizational change (1990–1994) and then the Work Education System (SET) (1996–2005) that would put theory into action, thus proposing a systemic option to approach organizational change.

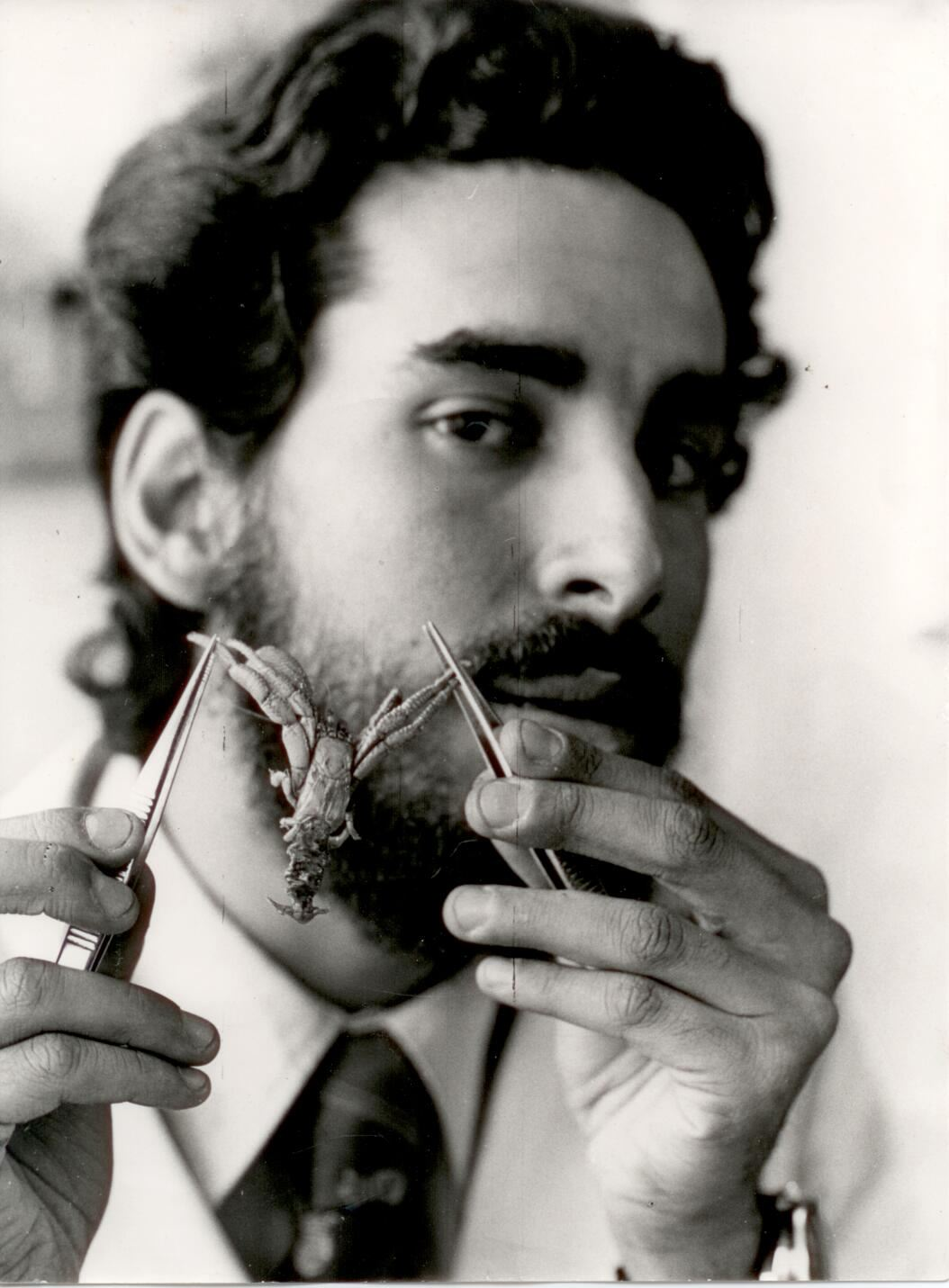
Aldemaro Romero Jr. At the Museum of Zoology of Barcelona.

Aldemaro Romero Jr. (born in Caracas, September 11, 1951) is a Venezuelan/American scientist, communicator, and advocate of liberal arts education. While an undergraduate student in biology at the Universitat de Barcelona in Spain, Romero volunteered at the Museum of Zoology (later renamed as Museum of Natural Sciences) where he created the Hydrobiology Section and led a group of other undergraduates to work on aquatic organisms reorganizing some of the collections and re-identifying some of the mislabeled specimens. He also volunteered working at the Museum of Geology of the Seminario Conciliar of Barcelona where he described several new species of Middle Triassic (240-235 million years old) horseshoe crabs and a set of fossils that he described as an entirely new group (subphylum) of animals never reported to science before. He is known for his approaches of combining field, laboratory and archival studies from different disciplines. Romero has held a long career as environmentalist (founder of ONG BIOMA), educator and academic administrator. Emigrated to USA he served as dean of the College of Arts and Sciences at Southern Illinois University Edwardsville until 2014 and became dean of the George and Mildred Weissman School of Arts and Sciences at Baruch College/City University of New York, effective July 2016. He has published more than 1,000 works, more than 20 books and monographs, and produced, directed, written and/or hosted more than 1500 radio programs and 50 TV shows and documentaries in areas ranging from science to history and philosophy.

=== Science journalism ===
Arístides Bastidas (San Pablo, March 12, 1924 – Caracas, September 23, 1992) was a Venezuelan journalist, educator and scientist and was one of the pioneers of what is termed as "science journalism" in Venezuela. He moved to Caracas with his family in 1936, settling in a modest neighborhood in the south of the capital. He studied there but did not complete studies because the family economic pressure forced him to perform various jobs until 1945, when started in print journalism. He sympathised with the resistance against the regime of Marcos Pérez Jiménez (1948–1958). A self-taught scientist, from 1968 to 1981 he directed the science page of the Sunday newspaper "El Nacional" where from 1971 until his death he wrote the daily column La Ciencia Amena. He considered the popularization of science as a tool to achieve technological self-determination and culture of countries. He co-founded the Iberoamerican Association of Science Journalists (Asociación Iberoamericana de Periodismo Científico) in 1969. For his contribution to the development of science journalism, Bastidas received recognition from the governments of Venezuela and Spain, and the United Nations Educational, Scientific and Cultural Organization (UNESCO), which awarded him the Kalinga Prize (Paris, 1980).

Marisela Salvatierra (Mérida, 1952– Caracas, 2003) was a Venezuelan Journalist who dedicated her professional life to the diffusion and education on environmental topics. She was a Venezuelan radiophonic host and editor of environmentally oriented books and magazines. In 2002 she became the first female science journalist to win the Kalinga Prize of Unesco.

== Technology ==
=== Computer science ===
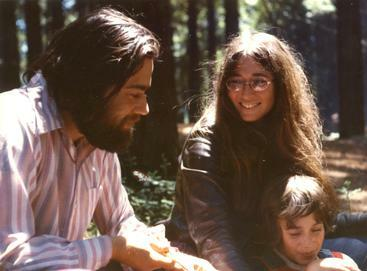
Manuel Blum (left) with his wife Lenore Blum and their son Avrim Blum, 1973

Manuel Blum (born in Caracas, April 26, 1938). Venezuelan computer scientist who received the Turing Award in 1995 "In recognition of his contributions to the foundations of computational complexity theory and its application to cryptography and program checking". Blum was educated at MIT, where he received his bachelor's degree and his master's degree in EECS in 1959 and 1961 respectively, and his PhD in mathematics in 1964 supervised by Marvin Minsky. He worked as a professor of computer science at the University of California, Berkeley until 1999. He is currently the Bruce Nelson Professor of Computer Science at Carnegie Mellon University, where his wife, Lenore Blum, and son, Avrim Blum, are also professors of Computer Science. In the 60s he developed an axiomatic complexity theory which was independent of concrete machine models. The theory is based on Gödel numberings and the Blum axioms. Even though the theory is not based on any machine model it yields concrete results like the compression theorem, the gap theorem, the honesty theorem and the Blum speedup theorem.

Some of his other work includes a protocol for flipping a coin over a telephone, median of medians (a linear time selection algorithm), the Blum Blum Shub pseudorandom number generator, the Blum-Goldwasser cryptosystem, and more recently captchas. In 2002 he was elected to the United States National Academy of Sciences. He and his wife resigned from CMU in 2018 to protest against sexism.

Cristina Amon (born in Caracas, 1959). Graduated as Mechanical Engineer at Simón Bolívar University in 1981 continued her education at the Massachusetts Institute of Technology where she earned her MS and ScD degrees in 1985 and 1988, respectively. Amon joined the Carnegie Mellon University in 1988 and later become director of the Institute for Complex Engineered Systems in 1999. She became the Raymond J. Lane Distinguished Professor of Mechanical Engineering in 2001. Amon's research pioneered the development of Computational Fluid Dynamics (CFD) for formulating and solving thermal design problems subject to multidisciplinary competing constraints. This led to her creation of a multi-stage concurrent thermal design methodology based on hierarchical model refinement, which combines CFD, non-deterministic experiments and Bayesian statistics. Her research has advanced the scientific foundation of heat transfer enhancement by flow destabilization and hemodynamics mass transport in biological systems including aortic aneurysms and intravenous blood oxygenators. She has made pioneering contributions to concurrent thermal designs, innovation in electronics cooling and transient thermal management of wearable computers. More recently, her research group has been focused on developing numerical algorithms for sub-micron and nano-scale heat transport in semiconductors (molecular dynamics, lattice-Boltzmann method and phonon Boltzmann transport).

In 2006 was appointed as Dean of Faculty of Applied Science and Engineering, University of Toronto. At the same time she was appointed as Alumni Chair Professor in BioEngineering at the Department of Mechanical and Industrial Engineering. Her achievements in education cover the whole spectrum of integrating education, research and engineering practice. Dedicated to outreach, she co-developed Engineering Your Future, the Society of Women Engineers workshop for female and minority high school students, and Moving 4th into Engineering, an outreach program targeted toward fourth graders. Other major projects include the development of the Identity, Privacy and Security Institute, which works in collaboration with policymakers, regulatory agencies and industry, plus multidisciplinary centres in sustainable energy and global engineering. In 2003, she received the Hispanic Engineer National Achievement Education Award and, in 2005, she was named one of America's most important Hispanics in technology and business.

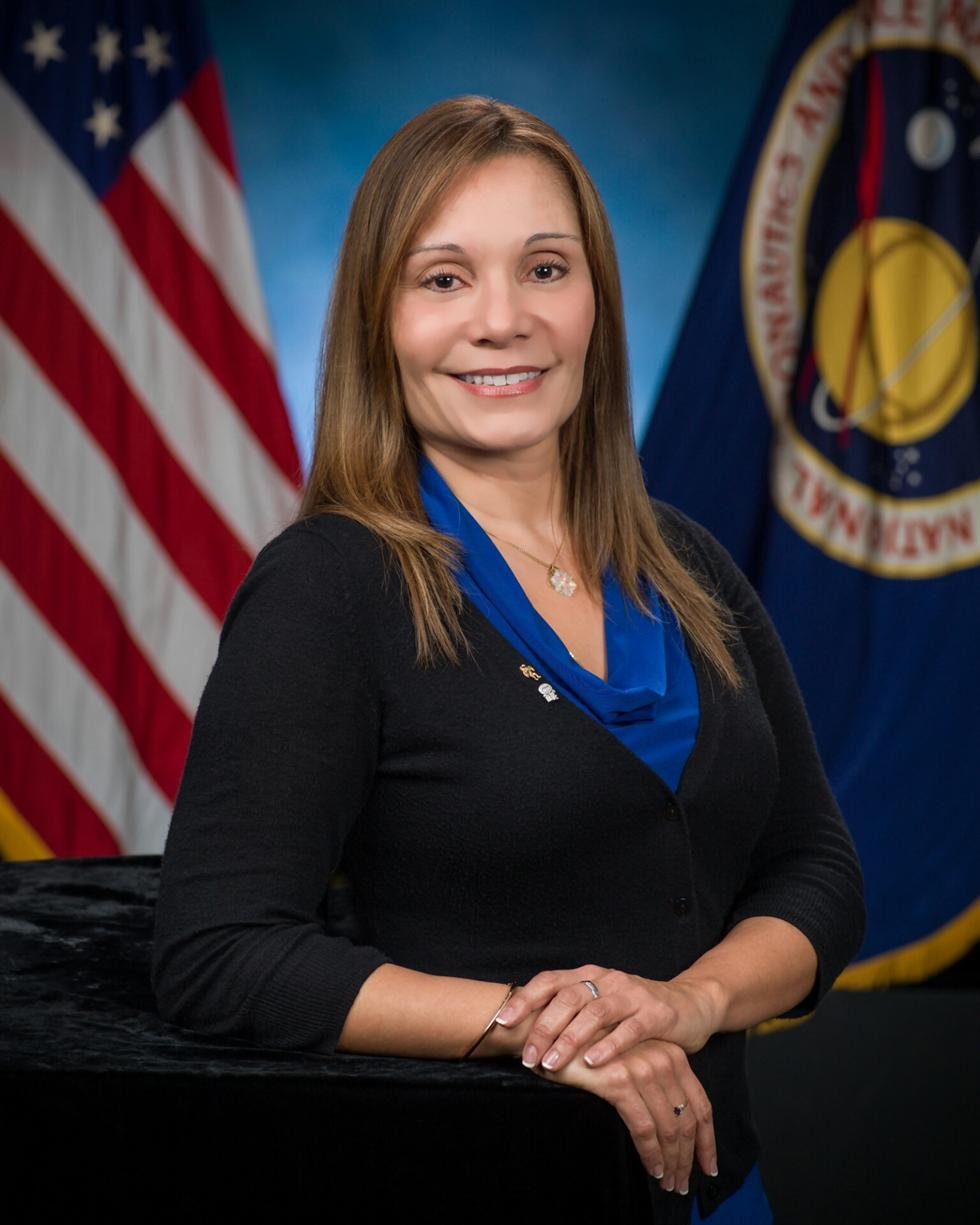
Evelyn Miralles at NASA

Evelyn Miralles (born in Caracas, 1967) is a pioneer of virtual reality at NASA. Since 1992 has worked at the Johnson Space Center's Virtual Reality Laboratory in Houston (Texas), where she is the Principal Engineer and Technology Strategist. Miralles has been supporting Space Shuttle and International Space Station missions. Her first project was building a 3D model of a habitat on the Moon. It was not feasible but could possibly be used in the future for a mission to Mars. Miralles was the co-author of the Dynamic Onboard Ubiquitous Graphics (DOUG) which has been used since 1993 for training in virtual reality by astronauts of STS 61 mission who repaired the Hubble Space Telescope, and then for all the other missions. She worked also in the space station ISS, designing the structure and work steps for the astronauts.

Santiago Schnell (born in Caracas, on October 6, 1971) is a biophysical chemist and computational and mathematical biologist. Schnell received his initial training in biological science from Universidad Simón Bolívar and doctorate in mathematical biology from the University of Oxford, England, United Kingdom. He pursued his doctoral and postdoctoral research under the supervision of Philip Maini, FRS in the Wolfson Centre for Mathematical Biology at the University of Oxford. He is Professor of Molecular & Integrative Physiology, a U-M Brehm Investigator in the Brehm Center for Diabetes Research, and Professor of Computational Medicine & Bioinformatics at the University of Michigan. He is considered a leader in Mathematical Biology, Computational Biology and Chemical Kinetics. His methods for modeling enzyme catalyzed reactions and reactions inside cells are one of the fast moving frontiers in computational biology according to the Institute for Scientific Information. Schnell's laboratory investigates biochemical and biological systems comprising many interacting components, where modeling and theory may aid in the identification of the key mechanisms underlying the behavior of the system as a whole. The primary focus on his research is biochemical kinetics, protein homeostasis and protein folding diseases.As of July 2025, he is the provost of Dartmouth College.

=== Materials Technology ===
Estrella de Laredo (born in Melilla, Spain, February 7, 1940) is a Venezuelan researcher and academic in the area of the Material Science. Graduated from the French Lyceum Regnault, Tangier, Morocco, as bachelor in mathematics, obtained a degree in physics from the University of Paris in 1962 and three years later obtained the PhD in crystallography at the same institution. She moved to Venezuela, where she worked at the Venezuelan Institute of Scientific Research (IVIC) between 1965 and 1973. In 1970 she was contracted as professor by the department of physics of the Simón Bolívar University, and from 1975 is titular professor. In 1996 was awarded with the National Prize of Sciences, Physical Mention, of the IVIC. She founded the Laboratory of Solid State Physics and of the FIMAC Group, both in the Simón Bolívar University. She is member of the Venezuelan Association for the Advancement of Science (AsoVAC), of the American Physics Society and of the European Society of Physics. She has authored or edited 33 books or monographs and co-authored more than 100 refereed publications. She is recipient of the National Prize for Science, Physical Mention, awarded by the National Council for Scientific and Technological Research. His work in the Technique of Thermo Stimulated Currents of Polarization and Depolarization for the analysis of materials are outstanding. In 2007 she was named emeritus researcher for the Researcher Promotion System and in 2009 she was named emeritus professor of the Simón Bolívar University.

== Scientific institutions ==
Based on article 110 of the Constitution of 1999, the Venezuelan government has established policies to promote the development of science and technology in the country. These policies are aimed at promoting technological independence, the development of science and technology for social inclusion and boosting the country's capacity in these areas. The Ministry of Popular Power for University Education, Science and Technology promotes plans and programs to support this national sector. One of the pillars of the government's approach to promoting science has been "Mission Science," a program founded in 2006.

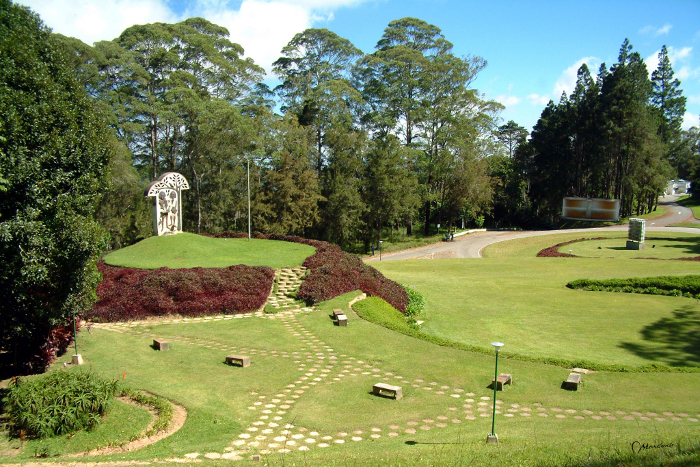
Campus Bolivar y Bello in IVIC

The National Fund for Science, Technology and Innovation (Fonacit), as well as other entities including the National Observatory of Science, Technology and Innovation (Oncti), provide support to different institutions, scientific groups, innovators and technologists, in order to generate proposals that offer solutions to problems of health, industry, safety, housing, food, among others. The National Foundation for Development and Investigation of Free Technologies (CENDITEL) has proposed the creation of a platform that offers the necessary services for the development of free technologies as well as free software throughout the nation with the goal of achieving technological sovereignty. This means that Venezuela will not have to rely on others countries to gain access to technologies necessary for the well-being of its own.

The Venezuelan Institute for Scientific Research (IVIC) is a research institute and graduate training in Venezuela founded on February 9, 1959, by government decree, has its origins in the Venezuelan Institute of Neurology and Brain Research (IVNIC) which Dr. Humberto Fernandez Moran founded in 1955.

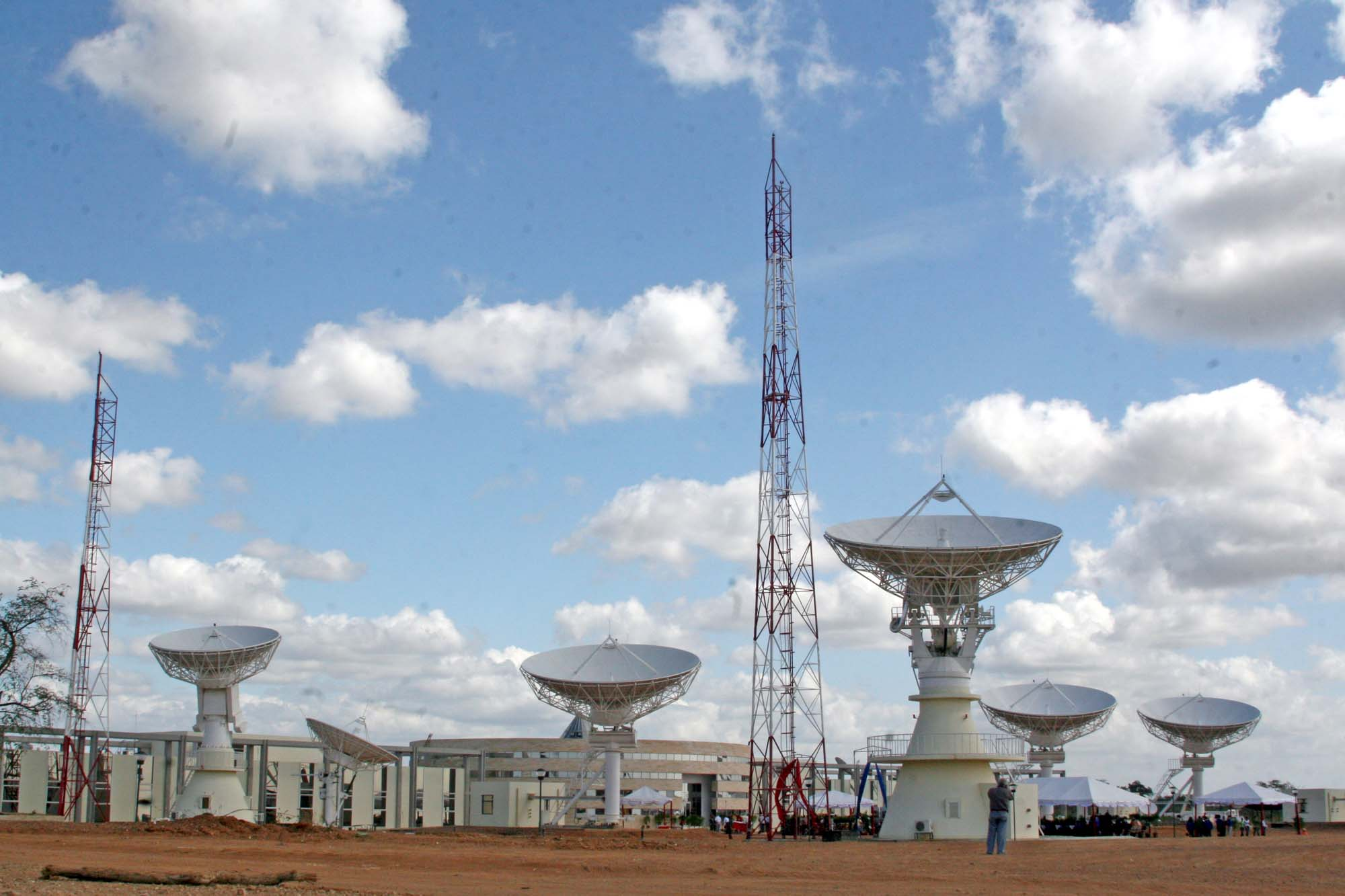
Agencia Bolivariana para Actividades Espaciales space centre

The Centro de Investigaciones de Astronomia (CIDA) was founded in honour of Francisco J. Duarte in 1975 for promoting observation, investigation, experimentation, theoretical work, and dissemination of research in the field of astronomy. Venezuela's main astronomical observatory is the Llano del Hato National Astronomical Observatory, located 3600m above sea level in the Venezuelan Andes providing high-level training. This is all carried out with a strong sense of the social relevance and technological independence of the country to help build a just, equitable, democratic, and participatory system. It participates in the Quasar Equatorial Survey Team.

The Institute of Venezuelan Petroleum Technology (INTEVEP) is the research arm of Petróleos de Venezuela S.A. (PDVSA). Intevep develops projects in the areas of oil exploration, production and refining. In 1976, the construction project for the facilities and laboratories of INTEVEP was started, located in what until that year had been a Jesuit seminary, called Villa Pignatelli, chosen for meeting the ideal conditions of geographical location. In June 1979, INTEVEP was incorporated as a trading company, a subsidiary of Petróleos de Venezuela. Currently, it is the headquarters of the Metropolitan Social District for the Altos Mirandinos and has the coordination of the Ribas Mision. Venezuela has a space agency, Agencia Bolivariana para Actividades Espaciales and control three stationary satellites: Simon Bolivar, Miranda and Sucre.

Hermano Gines created in 2000 the Society of Natural Sciences La Salle, from which the La Salle Foundation born in 1957. Along with the biologist Fernando Cervigón founded the Estación de Investigaciones Marinas de Margarita ("Margarita Marine Research Station"), where, discovered and described many species of fish of the South Eastern Caribbean.

The Oceanographic Institute of Venezuela (OIV) was created as a branch of the University of East by means of the Executive Order 459 of President Edgar Sanabria signed on November 21, 1958. The institute began its work in 1959 at the Marine Biology Laboratory of the Ministry of Agriculture in Caigüire, Sucre, and moved to its definitive headquarters at the University main campus in the city of Cumaná, in 1963. The oceanographic vessel Guaiquerí II was the IOV research platform. Equipped with all the necessary adaptations of a maritime laboratory, it was the means of transportation for the researchers and technical personnel to take samples of the marine flora and fauna on the Venezuelan coasts.

The OIV is one of the oldest and most important centers for oceanographic and marine science research and teaching in the Caribbean and Latin America regions.

== Overview of science and technology policy, 2015–2019 ==
The Plan de la Patria 2025 (2019–2025) is Venezuela's second socialist socio-economic development plan after the years 2013–2019. The Plan de la Patria 2025 establishes a national objective of developing scientific and technological capacities linked to citizen's needs. The National Science, Technology and Innovation Plan 2005–2030, subtitled Building a Sustainable Future, has fixed the following strategic objectives:

- to promote scientific and technological independence, in order to build an endogenous model of environmentally sustainable development;
- to support social inclusion in science and technology, whereby policies are developed by and for Venezuelan citizens; and
- to develop human resources, scientific infrastructure and technological platforms.

== Scientific output ==
Scientific publishing has been steadily declining in Venezuela, with a drop of 24% observed over the 2015–2019 period.

Venezuela was ranked 136th out of 139 in the Global Innovation Index in 2025.

== See also ==
- Venesat-1
- Education in Venezuela
- List of universities in Venezuela
- Spanish language in science and technology

== Sources ==
This article incorporates text from a free content work. Licensed under CC BY-SA 3.0 IGO Text taken from Latin America, in: UNESCO Science Report: the Race Against Time for Smarter Development., Gabriela Dutrénit, Carlos Aguirre-Bastos, Martín Puchet and Mónica Salazar, UNESCO.
