= Luis Herrera Cometta =

Venezuelan relativity physicist

Luis Herrera
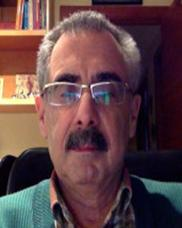
- Luis Herrera.
- Born: December 20, 1946 (age 79); Caracas, Venezuela
- Awards: Premio Polar (1985); Premio Nacional de Ciencias (1997).
- Scientific career
- Fields: Relativity and Astrophysics
- Workplaces: Universidad Central de Venezuela; Universidad del País Vasco
- Doctoral advisor: Achilles Papapetrou

Luis Alfredo "Gaucho" Herrera Cometta (born December 20, 1946) is a Venezuelan relativity physicist, whose research focuses on the study of anisotropy, the extended thermodynamics, exact and semi numeric solutions, axial symmetric solutions, alternative approaches to detect gravitational radiation using gyroscopes and recently about the relevance of super energy and super Poynting in General Relativity. Herrera is Emeritus Professor in the Escuela de Física at Universidad Central de Venezuela and currently is Visiting Professor at the Instituto Universitario de Fisica Fundamental y Matematicas, Universidad de Salamanca, Salamanca, Spain.

== Early life and education ==
Herrera earned a Bachelor of Science at Liceo Aplicación in Caracas in 1963. He graduated with a master's degree in physics from the People's Friendship University, Moscow, Soviet Union. He completed doctoral studies in France at the Henri Poincaré Institute, Paris, under the supervision of Achilles Papapetrou.

== Career in physics ==
Herrera returned to Caracas in 1972, taking a position as Assistant Professor at the Universidad Central de Venezuela. Later, while still an Associate Professor there, he continued his research as a research fellow at the University of Cincinnati, a research associate at the University of California and a visiting professor at the University of the Balearic Islands. In 1998 he was appointed a full professor, supervising and working with graduate students and Relativity researchers. Since then he has been a visiting or associate professor at a number of universities around the world. He continues to engage with the international Relativity community, in particular with Brazilians and Spaniards, and with British physicists by means of Bill Bonnor and Hermann Bondi

== Scientific accomplishments ==
As relativity physicist, his research focuses on the study of anisotropy, the extended thermodynamics, exact and semi numeric solutions, axial symmetric solutions, alternative approaches to detect gravitational radiation using gyroscopes and recently about the relevance of super energy and super Poynting in General Relativity. Herrera is Emeritus Professor in the Escuela de Física at Universidad Central de Venezuela and currently is Visiting Professor at the Instituto Universitario de Fisica Fundamental y Matematicas, Universidad de Salamanca, Salamanca, Spain. Luis Herrera has published 164 papers up to 2011. He helped to found the Relativity and Fields Seminar at Universidad Simón Bolívar. He is considered an authority in anisotropic effects on gravitational collapse; he is a pioneer in the heritage of symmetries within General Relativity and in the application of Extended Thermodynamics for Astrophysical scenarios. Herrera is known for semi numerical approaches to self gravitating objects, later interpreted as the Post-Quasistatic-Approximation, with a wide applications spectrum in Relativistic Astrophysics and basically in the spherical context. Recently (2011) he won a Honorific Mention for his essay on the meaning of general covariance and the relevance of observers in general relativity.

== Awards ==
- Premio Lorenzo Mendoza Fleury, Fundación Polar, Venezuela (1985);
- Premio Nacional de Ciencias, CONICIT, Venezuela (1997);
- Premio Fundación Juan Alberto Olivares, Academia de Ciencias Físicas, Matemáticas y Naturales, Venezuela (2006).
