= Lagunillas (Mérida) =

- Location within Venezuela
- Coordinates: 8.504°N 71.395°W

Lagunillas is a city in western Venezuela. It is the capital of the Sucre Municipality in Mérida State, located 30 kilometers from the city of Mérida.
