= Gap theorem (disambiguation) =

In mathematics, gap theorem may refer to:

- The Hadamard gap theorem on lacunary functions
- The Fabry gap theorem on lacunary functions
- Pólya's gap theorem on power series
- The Weierstrass gap theorem in algebraic geometry
- The gap theorem of Fourier analysis, a statement about the vanishing of discrete Fourier coefficients for functions that are identically zero on an interval shorter than 2π
- The gap theorem in computational complexity theory
- Saharon Shelah's Main Gap Theorem which solved Morley's problem in model theory
