= Gödel's proof =

Gödel's proof may refer to:

- Gödel's incompleteness theorems
- Gödel's ontological proof

See also: Gödel's theorem (disambiguation)
