= Ergün =

Ergun or Ergün may refer to:

== Places ==
- Ergun, Inner Mongolia, China
- Argun River (Asia), part of the Sino-Russian border

== Given name ==
- Ergun Caner (born 1966), Swedish-American academic, author, and Baptist minister
- Ergun Öztuna (1937–2023), Turkish football player
- Ergün Penbe (born 1972), Turkish football player
- Ergün Teber (born 1985), Turkish football player
- Ergün Zorlu (born 1985), Turkish tennis player

== Surname ==
- Funda Ergun, Turkish-American computer scientist
- Halil Ergün (born 1946), Turkish actor
- Sabri Ergun (1918–2006), Turkish chemical engineer
- Sine Ergün (born 1982), Turkish writer
- Zeynep Ergun (1953–2022), Turkish linguist
