= C/1885 X1 (Fabry) =

Parabolic comet

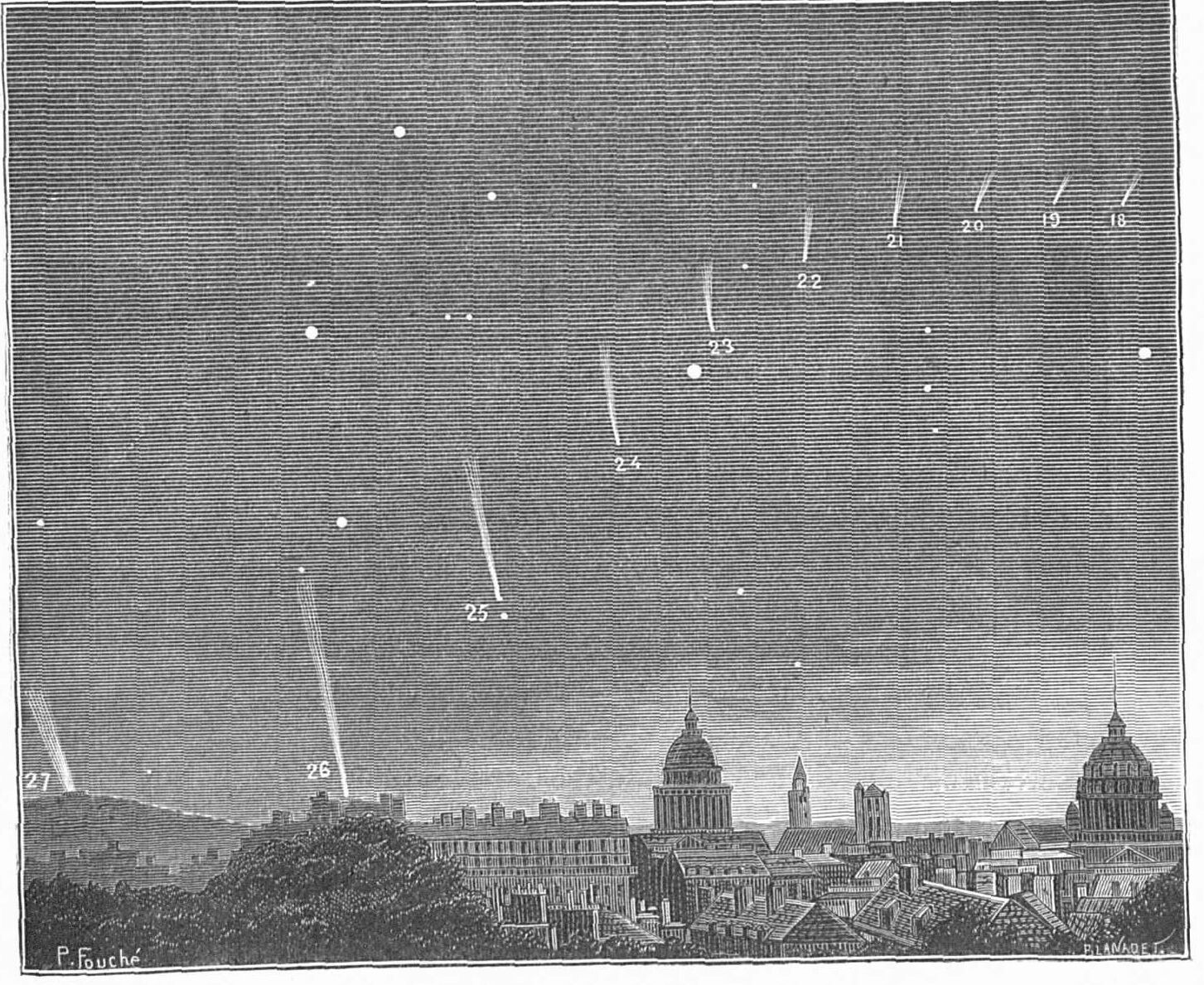
- Engraving of the positions of Fabry's Comet over the horizon of Paris, France in April 1886.

Discovery
- Discovered by: Louis Fabry
- Discovery site: Paris, France
- Discovery date: 1 December 1885

Designations
- Alternative designations: 1886 I, 1885d

Orbital characteristics
- Epoch: 18 January 1886 (JD 2409924.5)
- Observation arc: 142 days
- Number of observations: 46
- Aphelion: ~20,600 AU (inbound)
- Perihelion: 0.642 AU
- Semi-major axis: ~10,300 AU (inbound)
- Eccentricity: 0.99994 (inbound); 1.00010 (outbound)
- Orbital period: ~1.05 million years (inbound)
- Inclination: 82.630°
- Longitude of ascending node: 37.962°
- Argument of periapsis: 126.59°
- Mean anomaly: –0.001°
- Last perihelion: 6 April 1886
- Earth MOID: 0.181 AU
- Jupiter MOID: 0.781 AU

Physical characteristics
- Comet total magnitude (M1): 5.2
- Apparent magnitude: 2.0 (1886 apparition)

Fabry's Comet, formally designated as C/1885 X1, is a non-periodic comet that became visible to the naked eye on April 1886. It was the only comet discovered by the French astronomer, Louis Fabry.

== Observational history ==
While working at the Paris Observatory on the night of 1 December 1885, Louis Fabry discovered a new comet that was then a 12th-magnitude object within the constellation Pisces. (Note: Reported initial position upon discovery was: α = 0^{h} 39.1^{m} , δ = 21° 02′)

Ralph Copeland observed the comet at Dunecht, Scotland and described it as "brighter towards the preceding side" on 7 December 1885.
