= Semicomputable function =

In computability theory, a semicomputable function is a partial function $f : \mathbb{Q} \rightarrow \mathbb{R}$ that can be approximated either from above or from below by a computable function.

More precisely, a partial function $f : \mathbb{Q} \rightarrow \mathbb{R}$ is upper semicomputable, meaning it can be approximated from above, if there exists a computable function $\phi(x,k) : \mathbb{Q} \times \mathbb{N} \rightarrow \mathbb{Q}$, where $x$ is the desired parameter for $f(x)$ and $k$ is the level of approximation, such that:

- $\lim_{k \rightarrow \infty} \phi(x,k) = f(x)$
- $\forall k \in \mathbb{N} : \phi(x,k+1) \leq \phi(x,k)$

Similarly, a partial function $f : \mathbb{Q} \rightarrow \mathbb{R}$ is lower semicomputable if and only if $-f(x)$ is upper semicomputable or equivalently if there exists a computable function $\phi(x,k)$ such that:

- $\lim_{k \rightarrow \infty} \phi(x,k) = f(x)$
- $\forall k \in \mathbb{N} : \phi(x,k+1) \geq \phi(x,k)$

If a partial function is both upper and lower semicomputable, it is computable.

== See also ==
- Computability theory
