= Monodromy theorem =

Theorem in complex analysis

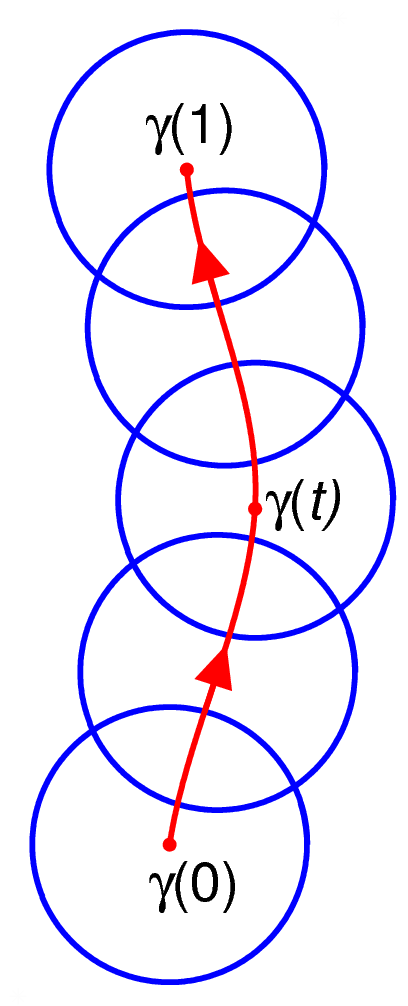
Illustration of analytic continuation along a curve (only a finite number of the disks $U_t$ are shown).

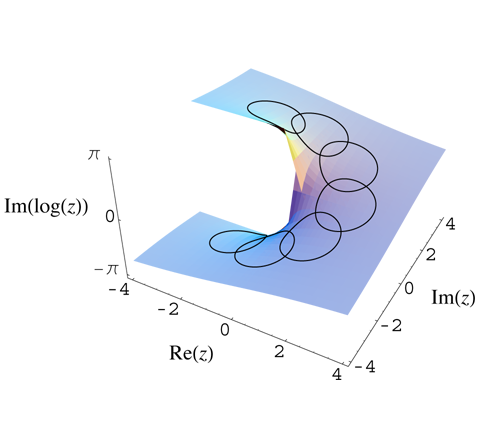
Analytic continuation along a curve of the natural logarithm (the imaginary part of the logarithm is shown only).

In complex analysis, the monodromy theorem is an important result about analytic continuation of a complex-analytic function to a larger set. The idea is that one can extend a complex-analytic function (from here on called simply analytic function) along curves starting in the original domain of the function and ending in the larger set. A potential problem of this analytic continuation along a curve strategy is there are usually many curves which end up at the same point in the larger set. The monodromy theorem gives sufficient conditions for analytic continuation to give the same value at a given point regardless of the curve used to get there, so that the resulting extended analytic function is well-defined and single-valued.

Before stating this theorem it is necessary to define analytic continuation along a curve and study its properties.

== Analytic continuation along a curve ==
The definition of analytic continuation along a curve is a bit technical, but the basic idea is that one starts with an analytic function defined around a point, and one extends that function along a curve via analytic functions defined on small overlapping disks covering that curve.

Formally, consider a curve (a continuous function) $\gamma:[0, 1]\to \Complex.$ Let $f$ be an analytic function defined on an open disk $U$ centered at $\gamma(0).$ An analytic continuation of the pair $(f, U)$ along $\gamma$ is a collection of pairs $(f_t, U_t)$ for $0\le t\le 1$ such that

- $f_0=f$ and $U_0=U.$
- For each $t\in [0, 1], U_t$ is an open disk centered at $\gamma(t)$ and $f_t:U_t\to\Complex$ is an analytic function.
- For each $t\in [0, 1]$ there exists $\varepsilon >0$ such that for all $t'\in [0, 1]$ with $|t-t'|<\varepsilon$ one has that $\gamma(t')\in U_t$ (which implies that $U_t$ and $U_{t'}$ have a non-empty intersection) and the functions $f_t$ and $f_{t'}$ coincide on the intersection $U_t\cap U_{t'}.$

== Properties of analytic continuation along a curve ==
Analytic continuation along a curve is essentially unique, in the sense that given two analytic continuations $(f_t, U_t)$ and $(g_t, V_t)$ $(0\le t\le 1)$ of $(f, U)$ along $\gamma,$ the functions $f_1$ and $g_1$ coincide on $U_1\cap V_1.$ Informally, this says that any two analytic continuations of $(f, U)$ along $\gamma$ will end up with the same values in a neighborhood of $\gamma(1).$

If the curve $\gamma$ is closed (that is, $\gamma(0)=\gamma(1)$), one need not have $f_0$ equal $f_1$ in a neighborhood of $\gamma(0).$ For example, if one starts at a point $(a, 0)$ with $a>0$ and the complex logarithm defined in a neighborhood of this point, and one lets $\gamma$ be the circle of radius $a$ centered at the origin (traveled counterclockwise from $(a, 0)$), then by doing an analytic continuation along this curve one will end up with a value of the logarithm at $(a, 0)$ which is $2\pi i$ plus the original value (see the second illustration on the right).

== Monodromy theorem ==
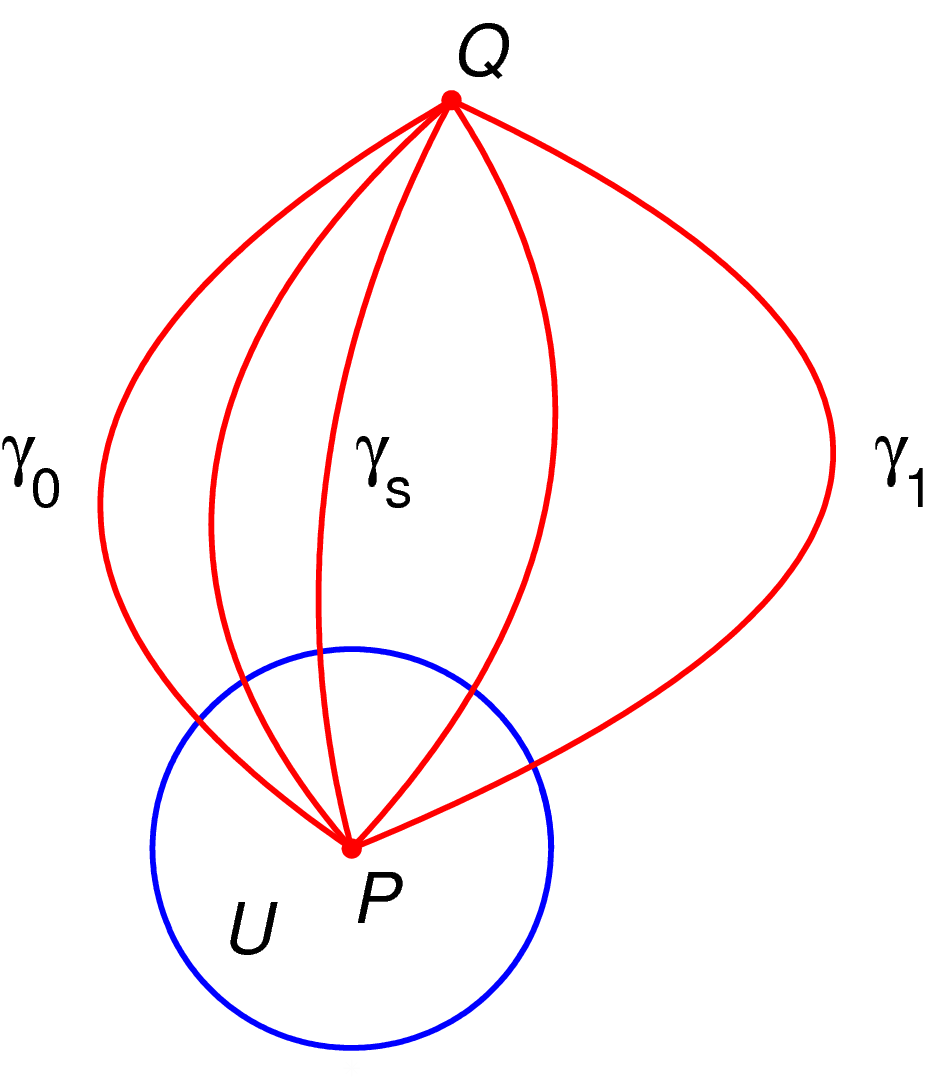
Homotopy with fixed endpoints is necessary for the monodromy theorem to hold.

As noted earlier, two analytic continuations along the same curve yield the same result at the curve's endpoint. However, given two different curves branching out from the same point around which an analytic function is defined, with the curves reconnecting at the end, it is not true in general that the analytic continuations of that function along the two curves will yield the same value at their common endpoint.

Indeed, one can consider, as in the previous section, the complex logarithm defined in a neighborhood of a point $(a, 0)$ and the circle centered at the origin and radius $a.$ Then, it is possible to travel from $(a, 0)$ to $(-a, 0)$ in two ways, counterclockwise, on the upper half-plane arc of this circle, and clockwise, on the lower half-plane arc. The values of the logarithm at $(-a, 0)$ obtained by analytic continuation along these two arcs will differ by $2\pi i.$

If, however, one can continuously deform one of the curves into another while keeping the starting points and ending points fixed, and analytic continuation is possible on each of the intermediate curves, then the analytic continuations along the two curves will yield the same results at their common endpoint. This is called the monodromy theorem and its statement is made precise below.

Let $U$ be an open disk in the complex plane centered at a point $P$ and $f:U\to \Complex$ be a complex-analytic function. Let $Q$ be another point in the complex plane. If there exists a family of curves $\gamma_s:[0, 1]\to \Complex$ with $s\in [0, 1]$ such that $\gamma_s(0)=P$ and $\gamma_s(1)=Q$ for all $s\in [0, 1],$ the function $(s, t)\in [0, 1]\times[0, 1]\mapsto \gamma_s(t)\in \mathbb C$ is continuous, and for each $s\in [0, 1]$ it is possible to do an analytic continuation of $f$ along $\gamma_s,$ then the analytic continuations of $f$ along $\gamma_0$ and $\gamma_1$ will yield the same values at $Q.$

The monodromy theorem makes it possible to extend an analytic function to a larger set via curves connecting a point in the original domain of the function to points in the larger set. The theorem below which states that is also called the monodromy theorem.

Let $U$ be an open disk in the complex plane centered at a point $P$ and $f:U\to\Complex$ be a complex-analytic function. If $W$ is an open simply-connected set containing $U,$ and it is possible to perform an analytic continuation of $f$ on any curve contained in $W$ which starts at $P,$ then $f$ admits a direct analytic continuation to $W,$ meaning that there exists a complex-analytic function $g:W\to\Complex$ whose restriction to $U$ is $f.$

== See also ==
- Analytic continuation
- Monodromy
