= Ortwin Hess =

German theoretical condensed matter physicist

- Born: 1966 (age 59–60)
- Education: Technische Universität Berlin; University of Erlangen–Nuremberg
- Scientific career
- Workplaces: LMU Munich; Stanford University; Tampere University of Technology; University of Edinburgh; Marburg University; University of Stuttgart; Trinity College Dublin
- Website: www.imperial.ac.uk/people/o.hess

Ortwin Hess (born 1966) is a German-born theoretical physicist at Trinity College Dublin (Ireland), working in condensed matter optics. In 2016, he was awarded the Rumford Medal for his 'pioneering work in active nano-plasmonics and optical metamaterials with quantum gain'. Bridging condensed matter theory and quantum optics he specialises in quantum nanophotonics, plasmonics, metamaterials and semiconductor laser dynamics. Since the late 1980s, he has been an author and coauthor of over 300 peer-reviewed articles, the most popular of which, called "'Trapped rainbow' storage of light in metamaterials", was cited more than 400 times. He pioneered active (gain enhanced) nanoplasmonics and metamaterials with quantum gain and, in 2014, he introduced the "stopped-light lasing" principle as a novel route to cavity-free (nano-) lasing and localisation of amplified surface plasmon polaritons, giving him an h-index of 60.

== Early life ==
Hess is a graduate of the University of Erlangen–Nuremberg and Technische Universität Berlin. From 1995 to 2003, he was post-doc at both the University of Edinburgh and Marburg University following by becoming faculty staff at the Institute of Technical Physics in Stuttgart, Germany in 1997. In 1998, he became adjunct professor at the Department of Physics of the University of Stuttgart and then also became lecturer of Photonics at the Finnish Tampere University of Technology. From 1997 to 1998, he was visiting professor at Stanford University and in 1999/2000 visiting professor at LMU Munich. In July 2012, he was a visiting professor from Abbe School of Photonics. He was the Leverhulme Chair in Metamaterials at London's Imperial College and co-director of the Centre for Plasmonics and Metamaterials. He is currently the Professor of Quantum Nanophotonics and an SFI Research Professor in the School of Physics at Trinity College Dublin. He also held the position of editor-in-chief of the open-access journal APL Quantum.

== Research ==
Investigating slow light in metamaterials Hess has discovered and explained the 'trapped-rainbow' principle by which the constituent colours of a light pulse are brought to a complete stand-still at different points inside a metamaterial (or plasmonic) heterostructure. He pioneered active metamaterials with quantum gain, developed the theory for optical chirality in self-organised nanoplasmonic metamaterials and recently introduced 'stopped-light lasing' as a novel route to cavity-free nanolasing and localisation of amplified surface plasmon polaritons (SPP) that is reminiscent of SPP-condensation.

Interest in the field of 'slow' and 'stopped' light arises from the prospect of obtaining much better control over light signals, with extremely nonlinear effects in interactions between light and matter, and optical quantum memories facilitating new architectures to process quantum information. With conventional dielectric materials, having a positive refractive index, it is impossible to 'stop' travelling light signals completely, not least because of the presence of structural disorder. This was an important observation, which Hess made from his extensive studies of slow light in semiconductor quantum dots and the dynamics of their spontaneous emission close to the stopped-light point in photonic crystals. Hess showed theoretically that a way to overcome this fundamental limitation of conventional media was to use nanoplasmonic waveguide structures.

Hess has also made contributions to spatiotemporal and nonlinear dynamics in semiconductor lasers and research in computational photonics. Algorithms and codes developed in his group run on high-performance parallel computers and have been used to elucidate a rich variety of aspects of modern nano-physics ranging from the definition of temperature in nanoscale systems, to optimisation of ultrashort pulses in experimentally realised quantum-dot semiconductor optical amplifiers. Since 2011, Hess developed the theory of optical activity in chiral nanoplasmonic metamaterials that provided explanation of experiments on tunability in self-organised gold metamaterials.

Recently Hess has started to develop "meta-lasers" and proposed "stopped-light nanolasing". This endeavor is backed by previous experience in nanoplasmonic metamaterials, quantum photonics and semiconductor lasers. Initially the goal of his work was to compensate dissipative losses in metamaterials by introducing gain. But now, one aims to create a new class of ultrafast 'stopped-light nano lasers', with unprecedented design features such as being smaller than a fifth of the wavelength and to provide a platform for integrating both light and amplified plasmons. The latter would enable integration at the nanoscale with semiconductor chips for telecommunications.

== Honors & Awards ==
In 2016, Hess received the Rumford Medal - awarded once every year - for his 'pioneering work in active nano-plasmonics and optical metamaterials with quantum gain'. He is a Professor Fellow at Trinity College Dublin and a Fellow of the Institute of Physics and of Optica. In 2024, he was elected a Member of the Royal Irish Academy.
