= Rumford Medal =

Award by Britain's Royal Society

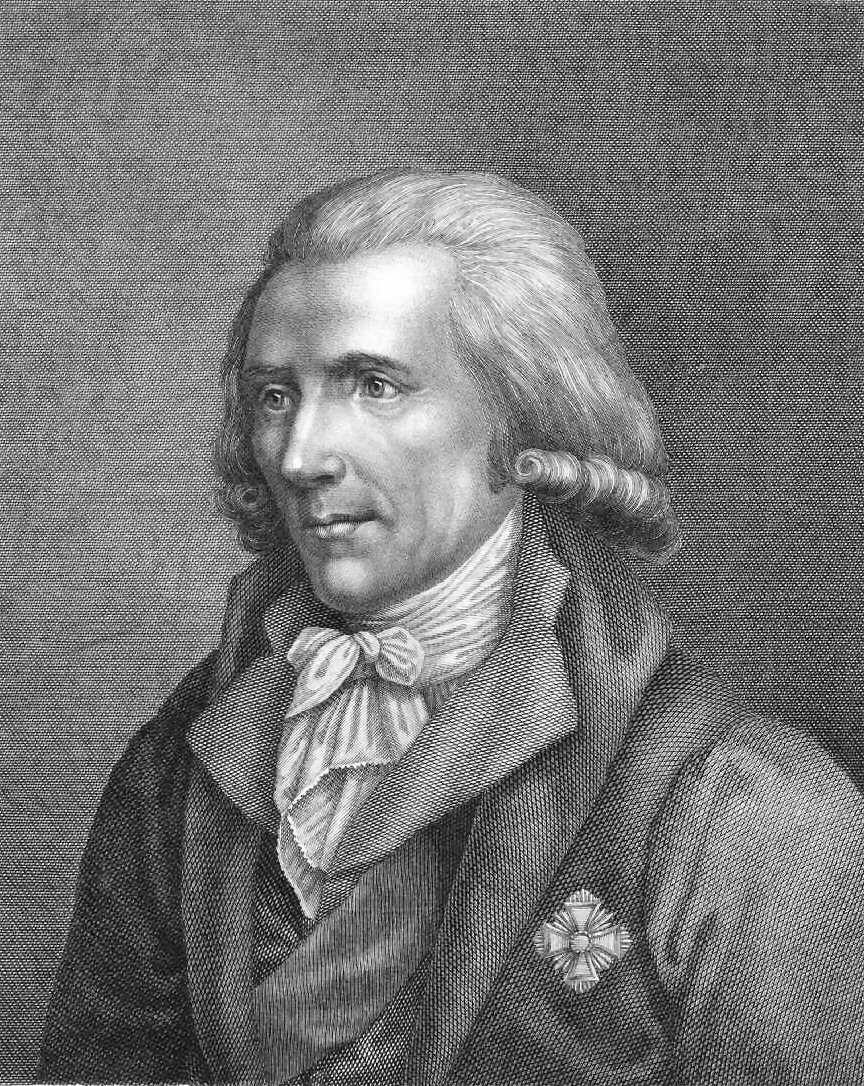
- Count Rumford (Sir Benjamin Thompson), for whom the award is named.
- Awarded for: "outstanding contributions in the field of physics"
- Date: 1800
- Country: United Kingdom
- Presented by: Royal Society
- Website: royalsociety.org/medals-and-prizes/rumford-medal

The Rumford Medal is an award bestowed by the Royal Society for "outstanding contributions in the field of physics". The award is named in honour of British scientist Sir Benjamin Thompson, Count Rumford, who is noted for his works on thermodynamics and for establishing the Royal Institution. The award was created in 1796 after Thompson transferred £1,000 to the Royal Society in stocks, instructing the latter to grant the awardee the fund's interest as a premium. Thompson was awarded the inaugural award in 1800.

The award initially consisted of two medals, one each in silver and gold, struck in the same die. This was later replaced with a single medal made of silver gilt. The medal is awarded with a cash prize of £2,000. British painter Robert Smirke created the original design of the medal. The diameter of the medal is 3 inches (7.62 cm). The obverse featured a tripod altar with a flame upon it, circumscribed by a Latin inscription from Lucretius' poem De rerum natura "Noscere quae vis et causa". The reverse had the Latin inscription "Proemium optime merenti ex instituto Benj. a Rumford, S.R.I. Comitis: adjudicatum a Reg. Soc. Lond." surrounded by an ornamental border of leaves. This design was discontinued in 1863. As of 2024, the obverse of the medal has a portrait of Thompson, surrounded by the Latin inscription "Beniamin Ab Rvmford S. Rom. Imp. Comes Institvit" ("Benjamin Rumford, Count of the Holy Roman Empire, founded this"), with the Roman numeral MDCCXCVI (1796) on the exergue. The reverse has the Latin inscription "Optime In Lvcis Caloqisqve Natvra Exqvirena Merenti Adivdicat Soc: Reg: Lond." ("The Royal Society of London awards this to one outstandingly deserving in investigating the nature of light and heat") inscribed within a wreath of oak and laurel leaves bound with ribbons.

All citizens or residents of the Commonwealth of Nations or the Republic of Ireland for more than three years are eligible for the medal. Candidates for the medal are selected by the Royal Society Council on the recommendations of the Physical Sciences Awards Committee. Ten times during the early 19th century, no medals were awarded due to the unavailability of suitable candidates or political considerations of the Royal Society Council.

Since its inception, the medal has been granted to 108 scientists. It has been awarded to citizens of the United Kingdom sixty-seven times, (Note: This number includes three scientists of mixed background. They are Ortwin Hess (German/British), Dennis Gabor (Hungarian/British) and Carlos Frenk (Mexican/British).) France fourteen times, Germany seven times, (Note: This number includes Ortwin Hess, who is of mixed background (German/British).) the Netherlands seven times, Sweden four times, the United States thrice, Italy twice, Hungary twice, (Note: This number includes Dennis Gabor, who is of mixed background (Hungarian/British).) and once each to citizens of Australia, Belgium, Luxembourg, Mexico and New Zealand. The medal has been awarded to multiple individuals twice: in 1896, to Philipp Lenard and Wilhelm Röntgen and in 1918, to Charles Fabry and Alfred Perot. From 1800 to 2018, the medal was awarded biennially; since then it has been awarded annually. The most recent recipient is British physicist Tony Bell, who received it in 2024. British academic and engineer Polina Bayvel is the only female recipient.

== List of recipients ==
List of recipients of the Rumford Medal
| Year | Portrait | Name | Nationality | Rationale | Notes |
|---|---|---|---|---|---|
| 1800 | Portrait of Sir Benjamin Thompson | Benjamin Thompson | American; British | "For his various Discoveries respecting Heat and Light" | (Note: Thompson received the medal in 1804.) |
| 1802 | No award | | | | |
| 1804 | Black-and-white portrait of Sir John Leslie | John Leslie | British | "For his Experiments on Heat, published in his Work, entitled an Experimental Inquiry into the Nature and Propagation of Heat." | |
| 1806 | No award | | | | |
| 1808 | Portrait of William Murdoch | William Murdoch | British | "For his publication of the employment of Gas from Coal, for the purpose of illumination" | |
| 1810 | Portrait of Étienne-Louis Malus | Étienne-Louis Malus | French | "For his discoveries of certain new Properties of Reflected Light, published in the Second Volume of the Mémoires d'Arcueil" | |
| 1812 | No award | | | | |
| 1814 | — | William Charles Wells | British | "For his Essay on Dew, published in the course of the preceding (1815) year" | |
| 1816 | Portrait of Sir Humphry Davy | Humphry Davy | British | "For his Papers on Combustion and Flame, published in the last volume of the Philosophical Transactions" | |
| 1818 | Portrait of Sir David Brewster | David Brewster | British | "For his Discoveries relating to the Polarisation of Light" | |
| 1820 | No award | | | | |
| 1822 | No award | | | | |
| 1824 | Black-and-white portrait of Augustin Jean-Fresnel | Augustin-Jean Fresnel | French | "For his development of the undulatory theory as applied to the phenomena of polarized light, and for his various important discoveries in Physical Optics" | (Note: Fresnel was awarded the Rumford Medal for the year 1824 in 1827.) |
| 1826 | No award | | | | |
| 1828 | No award | | | | |
| 1830 | No award | | | | |
| 1832 | Portrait of John Frederic Daniell | John Frederic Daniell | British | "For his paper, entitled, 'Further Experiments with a new Register Pyrometer, for measuring the Expansion of Solids,' published in the Philosophical Transactions for the year 1831" | |
| 1834 | Portrait of Macedonio Melloni | Macedonio Melloni | Parmesan | "For his discoveries relevant to radiant heat" | (Note: At the time of the award, Melloni was living as a refugee in France for his role in the rebellion of 1831 in Parma.) |
| 1836 | No award | | | | |
| 1838 | Black-and-white photographic portrait of James David Forbes | James David Forbes | British | "For his 'Experiments on the Polarization of Heat,' published in the Transactions of the Royal Society of Edinburgh" | |
| 1840 | Black-and-white lithographic portrait of Jean-Baptiste Biot | Jean-Baptiste Biot | French | "For his researches in, and connected with, the circular Polarization of Light" | |
| 1842 | Photographic portrait of William Fox Talbot | William Fox Talbot | British | "For his discoveries and improvements in photography" | |
| 1844 | No award | | | | |
| 1846 | Black-and-white photographic portrait of Michael Faraday | Michael Faraday | British | "For his discovery of the Optical Phenomena developed by the action of Magnets and Electric Currents in certain Transparent Media, published in the Philosophical Transactions for 1846" | |
| 1848 | Black-and-white photographic portrait of Henri Victor Regnault | Henri Victor Regnault | French | "For his 'Experiments to determine the Laws and the numerical data which enter into the calculation of Steam-Engines'" | |
| 1850 | Portrait of François Arago | François Arago | French | "For his 'Experimental Investigations on Polarized Light,' the concluding memoirs on which were communicated to the Academy of Sciences of Paris during the last two years" | |
| 1852 | Black-and-white photographic portrait of Sir George Gabriel Stokes | George Gabriel Stokes | British | "For his 'Discovery of the Change in the Refrangibility of Light'" | |
| 1854 | Black-and-white photographic portrait of Dr. Neil Arnott | Neil Arnott | British | "For the successful construction of a new smoke-consuming and fuel-saving fire-grate, described in the Journal of the Society of Arts of May 12, 1854" | |
| 1856 | Photo of Louis Pasteur | Louis Pasteur | French | "For his discovery of the nature of racemic acid, and its relations to polarized light, and for the researches to which he was led by that discovery" | |
| 1858 | Black-and-white photographic portrait of Jules Jamin | Jules Jamin | French | "For his various Experimental Researches on Light" | |
| 1860 | Black-and-white photographic portrait of James Clerk Maxwell | James Clerk Maxwell | British | "For his Researches on the Composition of Colours, and other Optical papers" | |
| 1862 | Black-and-white photographic portrait of Gustav Kirchhoff | Gustav Kirchhoff | Prussian | "For his researches on the fixed lines of the solar spectrum, and on the inversion of the bright lines in the spectra of artificial light" | |
| 1864 | Black-and-white photographic portrait of John Tyndall, photographed by Lock & Whitfield | John Tyndall | British | "For his researches on the absorption and radiation of heat by gases and vapours" | |
| 1866 | Black-and-white portrait of Hippolyte Fizeau | Hippolyte Fizeau | French | "For his Optical Researches, and especially for his investigations into the Effect of Heat on the Refractive Power of Transparent Bodies" | |
| 1868 | Black-and-white photographic portrait of Balfour Stewart | Balfour Stewart | British | "For his researches on the qualitative as well as quantitative relation between the emissive and absorptive powers of bodies for heat and light, published originally in the Transactions of the Royal Society of Edinburgh, and the Proceedings of the Royal Society of London, and now made more generally accessible by the publication in 1866 of his treatise on heat" | |
| 1870 | Black-and-white portrait of Alfred Des Cloizeaux | Alfred Des Cloizeaux | French | "For his researches in Mineralogical Optics" | |
| 1872 | Black-and-white photographic portrait of Anders Jonas Angström | Anders Jonas Ångström | Swedish | "For his Researches on Spectral Analysis" | |
| 1874 | Black-and-white portrait of Sir Norman Lockyer | Joseph Norman Lockyer | British | "For his spectroscopic researches on the sun and on the chemical elements" | |
| 1876 | Black-and-white photographic portrait of Jules Janssen, photographed by Nadar | Jules Janssen | French | "For his numerous & important researches in the radiation and absorption of light, carried on chiefly by means of the spectroscope" | |
| 1878 | Photographic portrait of Marie Alfred Cornu, photographed by Nadar | Alfred Cornu | French | "For his various optical researches, and especially for his recent re-determination of the velocity of propagation of light" | |
| 1880 | Portrait of Sir William Huggins, created by John Collier | William Huggins | British | "For his important researches in astronomical spectroscopy, and especially for his determination of the radial component of the proper motions of stars" | |
| 1882 | Black-and-white portrait of Sir William de Wiveleslie Abney | William de Wiveleslie Abney | British | "For his Photographic Researches and his discovery of the method of photographing the less refrangible part of the spectrum, especially the infra-red region; also for his Researches on the absorption of various compound bodies in this part of the spectrum" | |
| 1884 | Black-and-white portrait of Tobias Robertus Thalén | Tobias Robertus Thalén | Swedish | "For his spectroscopic researches" | |
| 1886 | Black-and-white photographic portrait of Samuel Pierpont Langley | Samuel Pierpont Langley | American | "For his researches on the spectrum by means of the Bolometer" | |
| 1888 | Black-and-white photographic portrait of Pietro Tacchini | Pietro Tacchini | Italian | "For important and long-continued investigations, which have largely advanced our knowledge of the physics of the sun" | |
| 1890 | Black-and-white photographic portrait of Heinrich Hertz | Heinrich Hertz | German | "For his work in electro-magnetic radiation" | |
| 1892 | Black-and-white photographic portrait of Nils Christoffer Dunér | Nils Christoffer Dunér | Swedish | "For his Spectroscopic Researches on Stars" | |
| 1894 | Black-and-white photographic portrait of Sir James Dewar | James Dewar | British | "For his researches on the properties of matter at extremely low temperatures" | |
| 1896 | Black-and-white photographic portrait of Philipp Lenard | Philipp Lenard | Hungarian | "For their investigation of the phenomena produced outside a highly exhausted vacuum tube through which electrical discharge is taking place" | (Note: At the time of the award, Lenard was living in Germany, though he retained his Hungarian citizenship.) |
| 1896 | Black-and-white photographic portrait of Wilhelm Röntgen, photographed by German photographer Nicola Perscheid in 1915 | Wilhelm Röntgen | German | "For their investigation of the phenomena produced outside a highly exhausted vacuum tube through which electrical discharge is taking place" | (Note: At the time of the award, Lenard was living in Germany, though he retained his Hungarian citizenship.) |
| 1898 | Black-and-white photographic portrait of Sir Oliver Lodge | Oliver Joseph Lodge | British | "For his researches in radiation and in the relations between matter and ether" | |
| 1900 | Black-and-white photographic portrait of Henri Becquerel | Henri Becquerel | French | "For his discoveries in radiation proceeding from Uranium" | |
| 1902 | Black-and-white photographic portrait of Sir Charles Algernon Parsons | Charles Algernon Parsons | British | "For his success in the application of the steam turbine to industrial purposes, and for its recent extension to navigation" | |
| 1904 | Black-and-white photographic portrait of Ernest Rutherford | Ernest Rutherford | New Zealander | "For his researches on radio-activity, particularly for his discovery of the existence and properties of the gaseous emanations from radio-active bodies" | (Note: At the time of the award, Rutherford was living in Montreal, working at McGill University.) |
| 1906 | Black-and-white photographic portrait of Hugh Longbourne Callender | Hugh Longbourne Callendar | British | "For his experimental work on heat" | |
| 1908 | Black-and-white photographic portrait of Hendrik Lorentz | Hendrik Lorentz | Dutch | "On the ground of his investigations in optical and electrical science" | |
| 1910 | — | Heinrich Rubens | German | "For his researches on radiation, especially of long wave-length" | |
| 1912 | Black-and-white photograph of Heike Kamerlingh Onnes | Heike Kamerlingh Onnes | Dutch | "For his researches at low temperatures" | |
| 1914 | Black-and-white photographic portrait of John William Strutt | John Strutt | British | "For his numerous researches in optics" | |
| 1916 | Black-and-white photographic portrait of Sir William Henry Bragg | William Henry Bragg | British | "For his researches in X-ray radiation" | |
| 1918 | Black-and-white photographic portrait of Charles Fabry | Charles Fabry | French | "For their contributions to optics" | |
| 1918 | Black-and-white photographic portrait of Alfred Perot | Alfred Perot | French | "For their contributions to optics" | |
| 1920 | Black-and-white photograph of Robert John Strutt with his son | Robert Strutt | British | "For his researches into the properties of gases at high vacua" | |
| 1922 | Black-and-white photographic portrait of Pieter Zeeman | Pieter Zeeman | Dutch | "For his researches in optics" | |
| 1924 | Portrait of Sir Charles Vernon Boys by John Collier | Charles Vernon Boys | British | "For his invention of the gas calorimeter" | |
| 1926 | Black-and-white photographic portrait of Sir Arthur Schuster | Arthur Schuster | German; British | "For his services to physical science, especially in the subjects of optics and terrestrial magnetism" | |
| 1928 | Black-and-white photographic portrait of Friedrich Paschen | Friedrich Paschen | German | "For his contributions to the knowledge of spectra" | |
| 1930 | Black-and-white photographic portrait of Peter Debye | Peter Debye | Dutch | "For his work relating to specific heats and X-ray spectroscopy" | |
| 1932 | Black-and-white photographic portrait of Fritz Haber | Fritz Haber | German | "For the outstanding importance of his work in physical chemistry, especially in the application of thermodynamics to chemical reactions" | |
| 1934 | Black-and-white photographic portrait of Wander Johannes de Haas | Wander Johannes de Haas | Dutch | "For his researches on the properties of bodies at low temperatures, and in particular, for his recent work on cooling by the use of adiabatic demagnetisation" | |
| 1936 | — | Ernest George Coker | British | "For his researches on the use of polarized light for investigating directly the stresses in transparent models of engineering structures" | |
| 1938 | Black-and-white photographic portrait of Robert W. Wood | Robert Wood | American | "In recognition of his distinguished work and discoveries in many branches of physical optics" | |
| 1940 | Black-and-white photographic portrait of Manne Siegbahn | Manne Siegbahn | Swedish | "For his pioneer work in high precision X-ray spectroscopy and its applications" | |
| 1942 | — | Gordon Dobson | British | "For his outstanding work on the physics of the upper air and its application to meteorology" | |
| 1944 | Black-and-white photographic portrait of Sir Harry Ricardo | Harry Ricardo | British | "In recognition of his important contributions to research on the internal combustion engine, which have greatly influenced the development of the various types" | |
| 1946 | — | Alfred Egerton | British | "For his leading part in the application of modern physical chemistry to many technological problems of pressing importance" | |
| 1948 | Black-and-white photographic portrait of Sir Francis Simon | Francis Simon | British | "For his outstanding contributions to the attainment of low temperatures and to the study of the properties of substances at temperatures near the absolute zero" | |
| 1950 | Black-and-white photographic portrait of Sir Frank Whittle | Frank Whittle | British | "For his pioneering contributions to the jet propulsion of aircraft" | |
| 1952 | Black-and-white photographic portrait of Frits Zernike | Frits Zernike | Dutch | "For his outstanding work in the development of phase-contrast microscopy" | |
| 1954 | — | Cecil Reginald Burch | British | "For his distinguished contributions to the technique for the production of high vacua and to the development of the reflecting microscope" | |
| 1956 | — | Frank Philip Bowden | Australian | "For his distinguished work on the nature of friction" | (Note: At the time of the award, Bowden was living in the United Kingdom.) |
| 1958 | — | Thomas Ralph Merton | British | "For his distinguished researches in spectroscopy and optics" | |
| 1960 | Black-and-white photographic portrait of Alfred Gordon Gaydon | Alfred Gordon Gaydon | British | "For his distinguished work in the field of molecular spectroscopy and particularly its application to the study of flame phenomena" | |
| 1962 | — | Dudley Maurice Newitt | British | "For his distinguished contributions to chemical engineering" | |
| 1964 | Black-and-white photographic portrait of Hendrik van de Hulst | Hendrik van de Hulst | Dutch | "For his distinguished work on the scattering processes in the interplanetary medium and his prediction of the 21 cm spectral line from interstellar neutral hydrogen" | |
| 1966 | Black-and-white photographic portrait of William Penney | William Penney | British | "In recognition of his distinguished and paramount personal contribution to the establishment of economic nuclear energy in Great Britain" | |
| 1968 | Black-and-white photographic portrait of Dennis Gabor | Dennis Gabor | Hungarian British | "For his contributions to optics, especially by establishing the principles of holography" | |
| 1970 | — | Christopher Hinton | British | "In recognition of his outstanding contributions to engineering and of his leadership of engineering design teams in the chemical and atomic energy industries and in electricity generation" | |
| 1972 | — | Basil John Mason | British | "In recognition of his distinguished contributions to meteorology, particularly the physics of clouds" | |
| 1974 | — | Alan Cottrell | British | "In recognition of his contributions to physical metallurgy and particularly in extending knowledge of the role of dislocation in the fracture of metals" | |
| 1976 | Black-and-white photograph of Viscount Ilya Prigogine | Ilya Prigogine | Belgian | "In recognition of his distinguished contributions to the theory of irreversible thermodynamics" | |
| 1978 | Black-and-white photographic portrait of George Porter | George Porter | British | "In recognition of his distinguished studies of very fast chemical reactions by flash photolysis" | |
| 1980 | — | William Frank Vinen | British | "In recognition of his discovery of the quantum of circulation in superfluid helium and his development of new techniques for precise measurements within liquid helium" | |
| 1982 | — | Charles Gorrie Wynne | British | "In recognition of his unique contribution to the design of optical instruments ranging from large telescopes to bubble-chamber optics" | |
| 1984 | — | Harold Hopkins | British | "In recognition of his many contributions to the theory and design of optical instruments, especially of a wide variety of important new medical instruments which have made a major contribution to clinical diagnosis and surgery" | |
| 1986 | — | Denis Rooke | British | "In recognition of his contributions to scientific developments in the gas industry" | |
| 1988 | — | Felix Weinberg | Czech; British | "In recognition of his pioneering work on optical diagnostics and electrical aspects of combustion and his fundamental studies of flame problems associated with jet engines and furnaces" | |
| 1990 | — | Walter Eric Spear | German | "For discovering and applying techniques for depositing and characterising thin films of high quality amorphous silicon and for demonstrating that these can be doped to give useful electronic devices, such as cost-effective solar cells and large arrays of thin film transistors, now used in commercial, flat-panel, LCD colour TV screens" | |
| 1992 | — | Harold Neville Vazeille Temperley | British | "In recognition of his wide-ranging and imaginative contributions to applied mathematics and statistical physics, especially in the physical properties of liquids and the development of the Temperley-Lieb algebra" | |
| 1994 | — | Andrew Keller | British | "In recognition of his contributions to polymer science, in particular his elucidation of the basis of polymeric crystallization, a fundamental ingredient in many materials, to methods of making strong fibres and to the understanding of polymer solutions which underlie this technology" | |
| 1996 | — | Grenville Turner | British | "In recognition of his work on the 40Ar/39Ar method of dating developing this technique to a sophisticated level and one which is widely used for dating extraterrestrial and terrestrial rocks" | |
| 1998 | Photographic portrait of Sir Richard Friend | Richard Friend | British | "In recognition of his leading research in the development of polymer-based electronics and optoelectronics leading to a very rapid growth of development activities aimed at plastic electronic displays, with advantages of very low cost, flexibility, and the option of curved or flat surfaces" | |
| 2000 | — | Wilson Sibbett | British | "In recognition of his research on ultra-short pulse laser science and technology." | |
| 2002 | Photographic portrait of Sir David King | David King | South African; British | "For outstanding contributions to our fundamental understanding of the structure and dynamics of reaction processes on solid surfaces" | |
| 2004 | — | Richard Dixon | British | "In recognition of his many contributions to molecular spectroscopy and to the dynamics of molecular photodissociation" | |
| 2006 | — | Jean-Pierre Hansen | Luxembourger | "For his pioneering work on molten salts and dense plasmas that has led the way to a quantitative understanding of the structure and dynamics of strongly correlated ionic liquids" | |
| 2008 | — | Edward Hinds | British | "For his extensive and highly innovative work in ultra-cold matter" | |
| 2010 | — | Gilbert George Lonzarich | British | "For his outstanding work into novel types of quantum matter using innovative instrumentation and techniques" | |
| 2012 | Photographic portrait of J. Roy Taylor | Roy Taylor | British | "For his outstanding contributions to tunable ultrafast lasers and nonlinear fibre optics, including fibre Raman, soliton and supercontinuum laser sources, which translated fundamental discoveries to practical technology" | |
| 2014 | Black-and-white photographic portrait of Jeremy Baumberg | Jeremy Baumberg | British | "For his outstanding creativity in nanophotonics, investigating many ingenious nanostructures, both artificial and natural to support novel plasmonic phenomena relevant to Raman spectroscopy, solar cell performance and meta-materials applications." | |
| 2016 | — | Ortwin Hess | German British | "For his pioneering work in active nano-plasmonics and optical metamaterials with quantum gain." | |
| 2018 | — | Ian Walmsley | British | "For pioneering work in the quantum control of light and matter on ultrashort timescales, especially the invention and application of new techniques for characterization of quantum and classical light fields." | |
| 2019 | Photographic portrait of Miles John Padgett | Miles Padgett | British | "For world leading research on optical orbital momentum including an angular form of the Einstein–Podolsky–Rosen" | |
| 2020 | Photographic portrait of Patrick Gill | Patrick Gill | British | "For his development of optical atomic clocks of exquisite precision, of ultra-stable lasers and of frequency standards for fundamental physics, quantum information processing, space science, satellite navigation and Earth observation." | |
| 2021 | Photograph of Carlos Frenk | Carlos Frenk | Mexican British | "For revealing via elaborate computer simulations, how small fluctuations in the early universe develop into today’s galaxies." | |
| 2022 | Photograph of Raymond Pierrehumbert | Raymond Pierrehumbert | American | "For his wide-ranging contributions to atmospheric physics, employing fundamental principles of physics to elucidate phenomena across the spectrum of planetary atmospheres." | |
| 2023 | Photographic portrait of Polina Bayvel | Polina Bayvel | British | "For pioneering contributions to the fundamental physics and nonlinear optics, enabling the realisation of high capacity, broad bandwidth, multi-wavelength, optical communication systems that have underpinned the information technology revolution." | |
| 2024 | Image of Tony Bell | Tony Bell | British | "For his seminal contributions to theoretical developments of cosmic ray acceleration and origins." | |
| 2025 | | Bernard F. Schutz | British | "For contributions to relativistic astrophysics, the detection of gravitational radiation and education." | |

== See also ==
- Awards, lectures and medals of the Royal Society
- List of physics awards
