= Fabry gap theorem =

Mathematical theorem

In analysis, the Fabry gap theorem is a result about the analytic continuation of lacunary power series. Such a power series is "badly behaved" in the sense that it cannot be extended to be an analytic function anywhere on its circle of convergence. It was proved by Eugène Fabry in 1896.

== Statement of the theorem ==
Let $0<n_0<n_1<\dots$ be a sequence of integers such that the sequence $n_k/k$ diverges to $\infty$, or equivalently
$$D := \limsup_{k\to\infty} \frac{k}{n_k} = 0.$$
Let $(a_k)_{k\ge0}$ be a sequence of complex numbers such that the power series

$$f(z) = \sum_{k=0}^\infty a_k z^{n_k}$$

has radius of convergence $1$. Then the unit circle is a natural boundary for the series $f$.

The theorem may be deduced from the first main theorem of Turán's method.

=== Converse statement ===
An exact converse to the theorem was established by George Pólya in 1942. If $D > 0$, then there exists a power series with exponent sequence $(n_k)_{k\ge0}$ of radius of convergence equal to $1$, but for which the unit circle is not a natural boundary.

== Pólya's gap theorem ==
Pólya's gap theorem, also known as the Fabry–Pólya theorem, is a refinement of the Fabry gap theorem. The theorem was proven by Fabry in 1899 and put in its modern form by Pólya in 1929, who also supplied a simpler proof. It states that every arc of the circle of convergence of length greater than $2\pi D$ contains a singularity of $f$. When $D = 0$, it follows that the singularities are dense on the circle of convergence, which is the conclusion of the Fabry gap theorem. This extension also bears a converse.

== See also ==
- Gap theorem (disambiguation)
- Lacunary function
- Hadamard gap theorem
