= Lacunary function =

Analytic function in mathematics

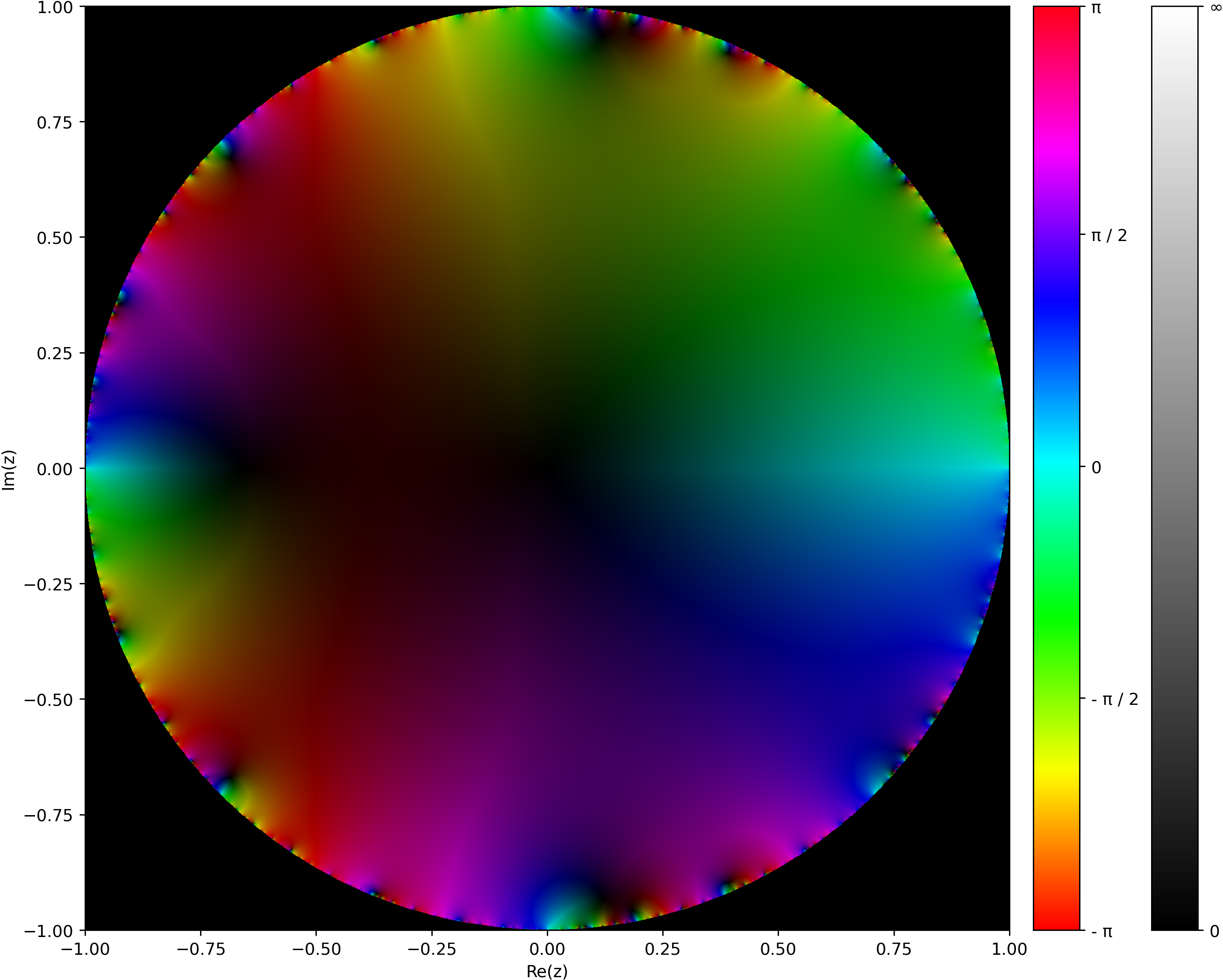
Domain coloring of the 128th partial sum of the lacunary function $\sum_{n=0}^\infty z^{2^n}$.

In analysis, a lacunary function or series is an analytic function containing many zero coefficients in its basis decomposition. A series can be lacunary in the sense of having Hadamard or Fabry gaps (or lacunae). They are associated with the Hadamard gap theorem and the Fabry gap theorem stating that a lacunary Taylor series cannot be analytically continued outside its disk of convergence. More recent investigations examine lacunary Fourier series as well.

The word lacunary is derived from lacuna (pl. lacunae), meaning gap, or vacancy.

== A simple example ==
Pick an integer $a \geq 2$. Consider the following function defined by a power series:

$$f(z) = \sum_{n=0}^\infty z^{a^n} = z + z^a + z^{a^2} + z^{a^3} + z^{a^4} + \cdots\,$$

The power series converges locally uniform on any open domain |z| < 1. This can be proved by comparing f with the geometric series, which is absolutely convergent when |z| < 1. So f is analytic on the open unit disk. Nevertheless, f has dense singularities on the unit circle, and cannot be analytically continued outside of the open unit disk, as the following argument demonstrates.

Clearly f has a singularity at z = 1, because

$$f(1) = 1 + 1 + 1 + \cdots\,$$

is a divergent series. But if z is allowed to be non-real, problems arise, since

$$f(z^a) = f(z) - z \qquad f\bigl(z^{a^2}\bigr) = f(z^a) - z^a \qquad f\bigl(z^{a^3}\bigr) = f\bigl(z^{a^2}\bigr) - z^{a^2} \qquad \cdots \qquad f\bigl(z^{a^{n+1}}\bigr) = f\bigl(z^{a^n}\bigr)-z^{a^n}$$

we can see that f has a singularity at a point z when z^{a} = 1, and also when z^{a^{2}} = 1. By the induction suggested by the above equations, f must have a singularity at each of the a^{n}-th roots of unity for all natural numbers n. The set of all such singularities is dense on the unit circle; so it is impossible to define f on any open set containing the unit circle, making analytic continuation impossible as well.

== An elementary result ==
The argument above shows that certain series define lacunary functions. What is not so evident is that the gaps between the powers of z can grow much more slowly, and the resulting series will still define a lacunary function. To make this notion more precise some additional notation is needed.

We write

$$f(z) = \sum_{k=1}^\infty a_kz^{\lambda_k} = \sum_{n=1}^\infty b_n z^n\,$$

where b_{n} = a_{k} when n = λ_{k}, and b_{n} = 0 otherwise. The stretches where the coefficients b_{n} in the second series are all zero are the lacunae in the coefficients. The monotonically increasing sequence of positive natural numbers {λ_{k}} specifies the powers of z which are in the power series for f(z).

Now a theorem of Hadamard can be stated. If

$$\frac{\lambda_k}{\lambda_{k-1}} > 1 + \delta \,$$

for all k, where δ > 0 is an arbitrary positive constant, then f(z) is a lacunary function that cannot be continued outside its circle of convergence. In other words, the sequence {λ_{k}} doesn't have to grow as fast as 2^{k} for f(z) to be a lacunary function – it just has to grow as fast as some geometric progression (1 + δ)^{k}. A series for which λ_{k} grows this quickly is said to contain Hadamard gaps; see the Hadamard gap theorem and its generalization, the Fabry gap theorem.

== Lacunary trigonometric series ==
Mathematicians have also investigated the properties of lacunary trigonometric series

$$S((\lambda_k)_k,\theta) = \sum_{k=1}^\infty a_k \cos(\lambda_k\theta) \qquad
S((\lambda_k)_k,\theta,\omega) = \sum_{k=1}^\infty a_k \cos(\lambda_k\theta + \omega) \,$$

for which the λ_{k} are far apart. Here the coefficients a_{k} are real numbers. In this context, attention has been focused on criteria sufficient to guarantee convergence of the trigonometric series almost everywhere (that is, for almost every value of the angle θ and of the distortion factor ω).

- Kolmogorov showed that if the sequence {λ_{k}} contains Hadamard gaps, then the series S(λ_{k}, θ, ω) converges almost everywhere if and only if $\sum_{k=1}^\infty a_k^2$ converges.
- Zygmund showed under the same condition that S(λ_{k}, θ, ω) is not a Fourier series representing an integrable function when this sum of squares of the a_{k} is a divergent series.

== See also ==
- Analytic continuation
- Hadamard gap theorem
- Fabry gap theorem
- Pólya's gap theorem
