= Blum's speedup theorem =

Rules out assigning to arbitrary functions their computational complexity

In computational complexity theory, Blum's speedup theorem, first stated by Manuel Blum in 1967, is a fundamental theorem about the complexity of computable functions.

Each computable function has an infinite number of different program representations in a given programming language. In the theory of algorithms one often strives to find a program with the smallest complexity for a given computable function and a given complexity measure (such a program could be called optimal). Blum's speedup theorem shows that for any complexity measure, there exists a computable function such that there is no optimal program computing it, because every program has a program of lower complexity. This also rules out the idea that there is a way to assign to arbitrary computable functions their computational complexity, meaning the assignment to any f of the complexity of an optimal program for f. This does of course not exclude the possibility of finding the complexity of an optimal program for certain specific functions.

== Statement ==
Given a Blum complexity measure $(\varphi, \Phi)$ and a total computable function $f$ with two parameters, then there exists a total computable predicate $g$ (a boolean valued computable function) so that for every program $i$ for $g$, there exists a program $j$ for $g$ so that for almost all $x$

$$f(x, \Phi_j(x)) \leq \Phi_i(x)$$

$f$ is called the speedup function. The fact that it may be as fast-growing as desired (as long as it is computable) means that the phenomenon of always having a program of smaller complexity remains even if by "smaller" we mean "significantly smaller" (for instance, quadratically smaller, exponentially smaller).

Furthermore, almost all total computable predicates are speedup-able, in the sense of the Baire category theorem.

== See also ==
- Gödel's speed-up theorem
