= Turán's method =

Number theory in mathematics

In mathematics, Turán's method provides lower bounds for exponential sums and complex power sums. The method has been applied to problems in equidistribution.

The method applies to sums of the form

$$s_\nu = \sum_{n=1}^N b_n z_n^\nu \$$

where the b and z are complex numbers and ν runs over a range of integers. There are two main results, depending on the size of the complex numbers z.

== Turán's first theorem ==
The first result applies to sums s_{ν} where $|z_n| \ge 1$ for all n. For any range of ν of length N, say ν = M + 1, ..., M + N, there is some ν with |s_{ν}| at least c(M, N)|s_{0}| where

$$c(M,N) = \left({ \sum_{k=0}^{N-1} \binom{M+k}{k} 2^k }\right)^{-1} \ .$$

The sum here may be replaced by the weaker but simpler $\left({ \frac{N}{2e(M+N)} }\right)^{N-1}$.

We may deduce the Fabry gap theorem from this result.

== Turán's second theorem ==
The second result applies to sums s_{ν} where $|z_n| \le 1$ for all n. Assume that the z are ordered in decreasing absolute value and scaled so that |z_{1}| = 1. Then there is some ν with

$$|s_\nu| \ge 2 \left({ \frac{N}{8e(M+N)} }\right)^N \min_{1\le j\le N} \left\vert{\sum_{n=1}^j b_n }\right\vert \ .$$

== See also ==
- Turán's theorem in graph theory
