= Alfred Perot =

French physicist (1863–1925)

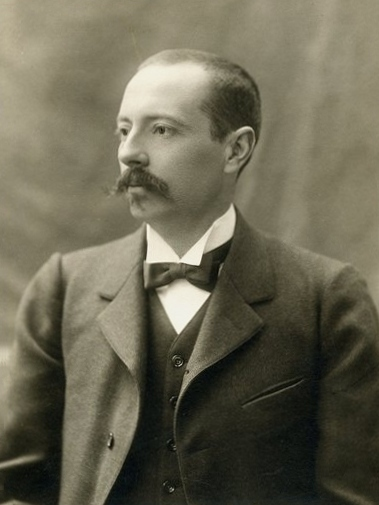
- Alfred Perot, a photo by Eugène Pirou
- Born: 3 November 1863; Metz, France
- Died: 28 November 1925 (aged 62); Paris, France
- Known for: Fabry–Pérot interferometer
- Scientific career
- Thesis: Sur la mesure du volume spécifique des vapeurs saturées et la détermination de l'équivalent mécanique de la chaleur (1888)

Jean-Baptiste Alfred Perot (English: /pəˈroʊ/ puh-ROH, French: [ʒɑ̃ batist alfʁɛd peʁo]; 3 November 1863 – 28 November 1925) was a French physicist.

Together with his colleague Charles Fabry he developed the Fabry–Pérot interferometer in 1899.

The French Academy of Sciences awarded him the Janssen Medal for 1912. The Royal Society awarded Fabry and Perot the Rumford medal in 1918.

== Spelling ==
There is some confusion about the spelling of Perot's last name. Perot himself used the spelling Pérot in some scientific publications, but according to the French civil registry, his family name was Perot, without accent.
