= Hadamard gap theorem =

In mathematics, the Hadamard gap theorem is a result about the analytic continuation of lacunary power series. Such a power series is "badly behaved" in the sense that it cannot be extended to be an analytic function anywhere on the boundary of its disk of convergence. The result was proved by Jacques Hadamard in his influencial 1892 thesis.

== Statement of the theorem ==
Let $0<n_0<n_1<\dots$ be a sequence of integers such that the $n_{k+1}/n_k \ge \lambda > 1$ for $k \ge 0$, or equivalently
$$\liminf_{k\to\infty} \frac{n_{k+1}}{n_k} > 1.$$
Let $(a_k)_{k\ge0}$ be a sequence of complex numbers such that the power series

$$f(z) = \sum_{k=0}^\infty a_k z^{n_k}$$

has radius of convergence $1$. Then the unit circle is a natural boundary for the series $f$.

This theorem is a special case of both the Fabry gap theorem and Ostrowski's overconvergence theorem.

== See also ==
- Lacunary function
- Pólya's gap theorem
