= Gödel's theorem =

Gödel's theorem may refer to any of several theorems developed by the mathematician Kurt Gödel:

- Gödel's incompleteness theorems
- Gödel's completeness theorem
- Gödel's speed-up theorem

== See also ==
- Gödel's ontological proof
