= Louis Fabry =

French astronomer (1862–1939)

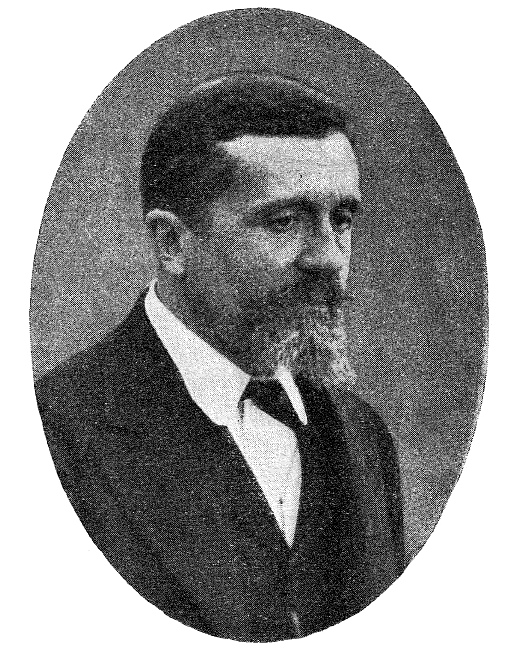
- Born: 20 April 1862; Marseille, France
- Died: 26 January 1939 (aged 76); Les Lecques, France
- Scientific career
- Fields: Astronomy
- Thesis: Étude sur la probabilité des comètes hyperboliques et l'origine des comètes (1893)

Louis Fabry (20 April 1862 – 26 January 1939) was a French astronomer

== Biography ==
Louis Fabry was born in Marseille in 1862 to a Provençal family with five boys. His brothers Charles, Eugène and Auguste were, respectively, a physicist, a mathematician and a magistrate.

From childhood he showed a keen taste for astronomy and mathematics. He joined the École Polytechnique in 1880, before his brother Eugène and five years before his brother Charles.

After receiving his licenciate, he became a student in the school of astronomy that Admiral Mouchez had just opened at the Paris Observatory, where he discovered his first and only comet, C/1885 X1 (Fabry), in December 1885. He was then sent to the Nice Observatory and remained there until 1890. It was during his stay in Nice he married and became widowed a few months after.

Back in his hometown, he joined the Marseille Observatory where he was promoted to assistant astronomer in 1895. He remained there until his retirement in 1924.

He died in Les Lecques in 1939.
