= Compression theorem =

In computational complexity theory, the compression theorem is an important theorem about the complexity of computable functions.

The theorem states that there exists no largest complexity class, with computable boundary, which contains all computable functions.

== Compression theorem ==
Given a Gödel numbering $\varphi$ of the computable functions and a Blum complexity measure $\Phi$ where a complexity class for a boundary function $f$ is defined as

$$\mathrm{C}(f):= \{\varphi_i \in \mathbf{R}^{(1)} | (\forall^\infty x) \, \Phi_i (x) \leq f(x) \}.$$

Then there exists a total computable function $f$ so that for all $i$

$$\mathrm{Dom}(\varphi_i) = \mathrm{Dom}(\varphi_{f(i)})$$

and

$$\mathrm{C}(\varphi_i) \subsetneq \mathrm{C}(\varphi_{f(i)}).$$
