= Alfred Gordon Gaydon =

British physicist (1911–2004)

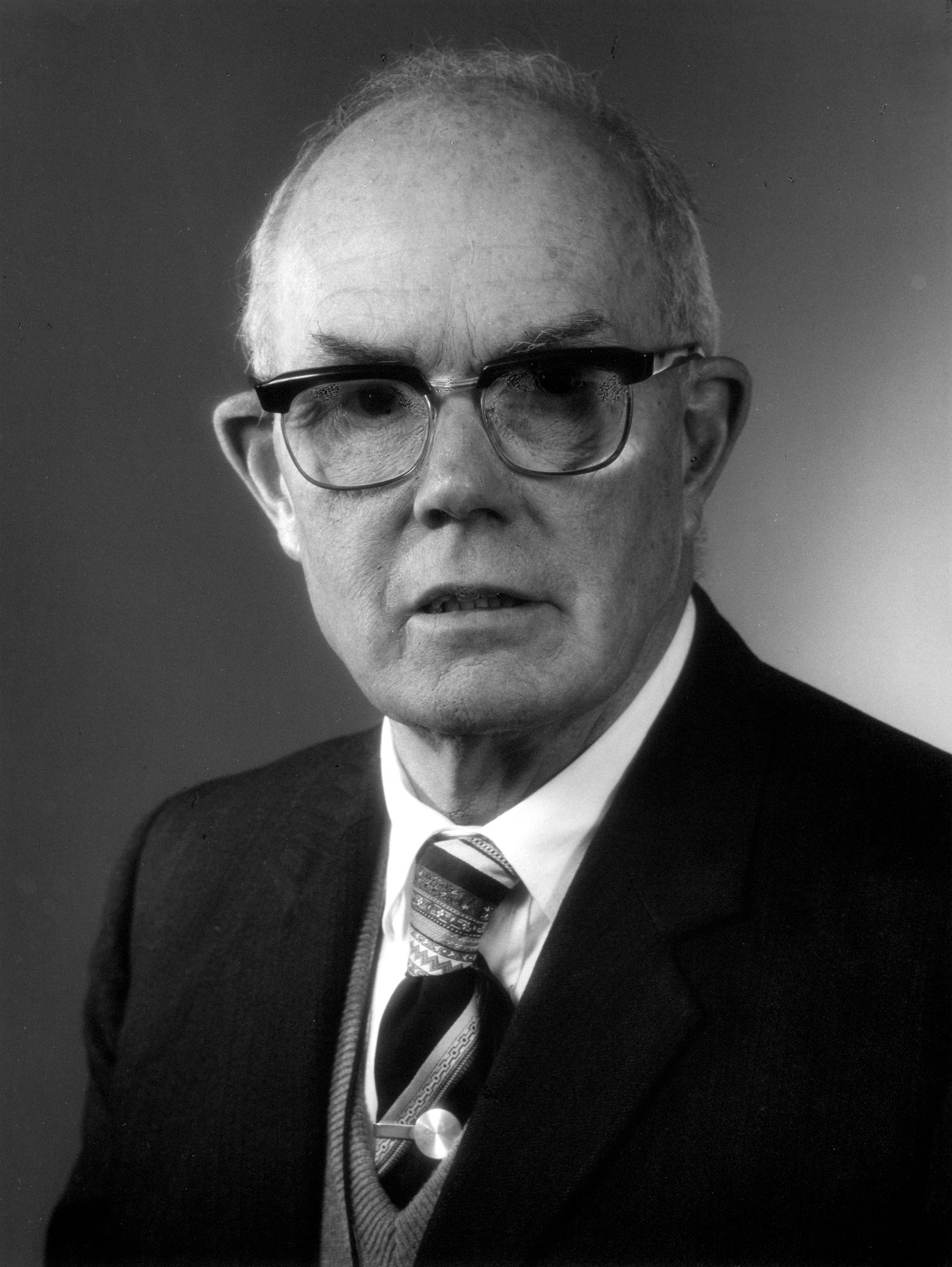
Portrait of Alfred Gordon Gaydon

Alfred Gordon Gaydon (26 September 1911 – 16 April 2004) was a leading spectroscopist and combustion scientist.

He was brought up at Surbiton, Surrey, where he attended Kingston Grammar School. There he became a keen oarsman, later rowing for Imperial College, London, and Kingston Rowing Club. In 1929 he graduated in Physics from the Royal College of Science (now Imperial College) and, after a period of post graduate study there accepted a post at the Shirley Institute of the Cotton Research Association near Manchester.

He was responsible for developing the shock tube as a means to study flames and combustion, and was elected a fellow of the Royal Society of London in 1953 and in 1960 awarded their Rumford Medal.

He is perhaps best known, however, for his ability to see ultraviolet light. In 1936, while he was working at the Shirley Institute, a laboratory explosion damaged his eye, which was later removed. His remaining eye, which had the lens removed was blind. But slowly, he began to regain sight and discovered that he could now see ultraviolet, although he perceived the colour as blue.

In 1936 he returned to Imperial College and later held the Warren Fellowship of the Royal Society and, from 1961, the Chair of Molecular Spectroscopy in the Department of Chemical Engineering and Chemical Technology .

He died in 2004. He had married Phillis Gaze in 1940.

== Books ==
- A.G. Gaydon (1974). The Spectroscopy of Flames. Springer. ISBN 978-9400957220.
- A.G. Gaydon (1979). Flames, Their Structure, Radiation, and Temperature. Chapman & Hall. ISBN 978-0470264812.
- A.G. Gaydon, I.R. Hurle (1963). The Shock Tube In High Temperature Chemical Physics. Literary Licensing. ISBN 978-1258637460.
