= Ronitt Rubinfeld =

American computer scientist

- Born: 1964 (age 61–62)
- Education: University of California, Berkeley (PhD, 1990); University of Michigan (BSE, 1985)
- Awards: ACM Fellow (2014)
- Scientific career
- Fields: Computer science
- Workplaces: MIT
- Doctoral advisor: Manuel Blum
- Doctoral students: Funda Ergun

Ronitt Rubinfeld (born 1964) is an Israeli-American theoretical computer scientist. She is a professor in the Department of Electrical Engineering and Computer Science at the Massachusetts Institute of Technology . At MIT she is a faculty lead for the Theory of Computation group at the Computer Science and Artificial Intelligence Laboratory.

== Biography ==
Rubinfeld was born in 1964 to an American father and Israeli mother in Ohio and grew up in Ann Arbor, Michigan. She graduated from Huron High School in 1981 and received a BSE in Electrical and Computer Engineering from the University of Michigan in 1985. She completed a PhD from the University of California, Berkeley in 1990 advised by Manuel Blum. From 1990 to 1992 she was a postdoctoral researcher at Princeton University and then at the Hebrew University of Jerusalem.

In 1992, Rubinfeld became an assistant professor of computer science at Cornell University and in 1998 was promoted to associate professor. In 2004, she became a full professor in the Department of Electrical Engineering and Computer Science at the Massachusetts Institute of Technology in Cambridge. In 2008, she was appointed a full professor in the Raymond and Beverly Sackler Faculty of Exact Sciences at Tel Aviv University.

Rubinfeld has also held positions in several industrial research laboratories. In 1998, she was a visiting researcher at the IBM Research Almaden. From 1999 to 2003 she was a senior researcher at the NEC laboratories in Princeton and in 2004 she was a researcher at the Radcliffe Institute for Science Research.

== Work ==
Rubinfeld is known for work in computational complexity theory and randomized algorithms. One of her major contributions is her work on property testing, which involves designing algorithms to quickly test whether a given object satisfies a certain property. This research has practical applications in fields such as data mining, machine learning, and computer vision, as well as in network and system security.

Rubinfeld has also made important contributions to the study of sublinear-time algorithms, which are algorithms that do not need to process the entire input in order to produce an accurate result. These algorithms are particularly useful for large-scale data analysis, where processing the entire input may be prohibitively expensive in terms of time and resources.

She has co-authored more than 120 academic articles that have been cited in thousands of different articles. One of her main results, and in the field of model property testing in general, is a method for testing the linearity of a function, which she developed in her work with Manuel Blum and Michael Luby in 1993. The method allows, by sampling a small number of values of a given function, to determine with high probability whether the function is close to a linear function or not.

== Awards and honors ==
Rubinfeld was an invited lecturer at the International Congress of Mathematicians in 2006. She became a fellow of the Association for Computing Machinery in 2014 for "contributions to delegated computation, sublinear time algorithms and property testing." She became a fellow of the American Academy of Arts and Sciences (AAAS) in 2020, a member of the National Academy of Sciences in 2022, and a Guggenheim Fellow in 2023.

== Personal life ==
Rubinfeld is married to Ran Canetti, also a theoretical computer scientist.
