= Analytic continuation =

Extension of the domain of an analytic function (mathematics)

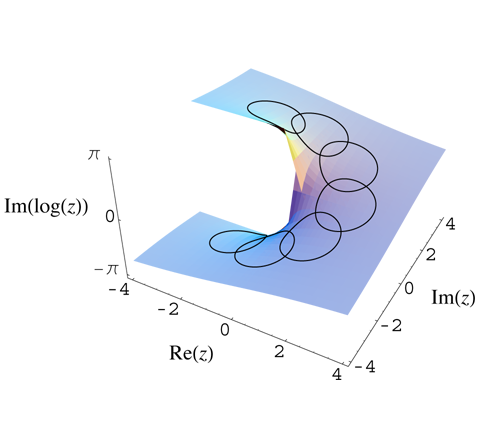
Analytic continuation of natural logarithm (imaginary part)

In complex analysis, a branch of mathematics, analytic continuation is a technique to extend the domain of definition of a given analytic function. Analytic continuation often succeeds in defining further values of a function, for example in a new region where the infinite series representation that initially defined the function becomes divergent.

The step-wise continuation technique may, however, come up against difficulties. These may have an essentially topological nature, leading to inconsistencies (defining more than one value). They may alternatively have to do with the presence of singularities. The case of several complex variables is rather different, since singularities then need not be isolated points, and its investigation was a major reason for the development of sheaf cohomology.

== Initial discussion ==
Suppose f is an analytic function defined on a non-empty open subset U of the complex plane $\Complex$. If V is a larger open subset of $\Complex$, containing U, and F is an analytic function defined on V such that

$$F(z) = f(z) \qquad \forall z \in U,$$

then F is called an analytic continuation of f. In other words, the restriction of F to U is the function f we started with.

Analytic continuations are unique in the following sense: if V is the connected domain of two analytic functions F_{1} and F_{2} such that U is contained in V and for all z in U

$$F_1(z) = F_2(z) = f(z),$$

then

$$F_1 = F_2$$

on all of V. This is because F_{1} − F_{2} is an analytic function which vanishes on the open, connected domain U of f and hence must vanish on its entire domain. This follows directly from the identity theorem for holomorphic functions.

== Applications ==
A common way to define functions in complex analysis proceeds by first specifying the function on a small domain only, and then extending it by analytic continuation.

In practice, this continuation is often done by first establishing some functional equation on the small domain and then using this equation to extend the domain. Examples are the Riemann zeta function and the gamma function.

The concept of a universal cover was first developed to define a natural domain for the analytic continuation of an analytic function. The idea of finding the maximal analytic continuation of a function in turn led to the development of the idea of Riemann surfaces.

Analytic continuation is used in Riemannian manifolds, in the context of solutions of Einstein's equations. For example, Schwarzschild coordinates can be analytically continued into Kruskal–Szekeres coordinates.

== Worked example ==
Analytic continuation from U (centered at 1) to V (centered at a=1.5+0.5i)

Begin with a particular analytic function $f$. In this case, it is given by a power series centered at $z=1$:

$$f(z) = \sum_{k=0}^\infty (-1)^k (z-1)^k.$$

By the Cauchy–Hadamard theorem, its radius of convergence is 1. That is, $f$ is defined and analytic on the open set $U = \{|z-1|<1\}$ which has boundary $\partial U = \{|z-1|=1\}$. Indeed, the series diverges at $z=0 \in \partial U$.

Pretend we don't know that $f(z)=1/z$ (because it is a geometric series), and focus on recentering the power series at a different point $a \in U$:

$$f(z) = \sum_{k=0}^\infty a_k (z-a)^k.$$

We'll calculate the $a_k$'s and determine whether this new power series converges in an open set $V$ which is not contained in $U$. If so, we will have analytically continued $f$ to the region $U \cup V$ which is strictly larger than $U$.

The distance from $a$ to $\partial U$ is $\rho = 1 - |a-1| > 0$. Take $0 < r < \rho$; let $D$ be the disk of radius $r$ around $a$; and let $\partial D$ be its boundary. Then $D \cup \partial D \subset U$. Using Cauchy's differentiation formula to calculate the new coefficients, one has
$$\begin{align}
a_k &= \frac{f^{(k)}(a)}{k!} \\
&=\frac{1}{2\pi i} \int_{\partial D} \frac{f(\zeta) d \zeta}{(\zeta -a)^{k+1}} \\
&=\frac{1}{2\pi i} \int_{\partial D} \frac{\sum_{n=0}^\infty (-1)^n (\zeta-1)^n d \zeta}{(\zeta -a)^{k+1}} \\
&=\frac{1}{2\pi i} \sum_{n=0}^\infty (-1)^n \int_{\partial D} \frac{(\zeta-1)^n d\zeta}{(\zeta -a)^{k+1}} \\
&=\frac{1}{2\pi i} \sum_{n=0}^\infty (-1)^n \int_0^{2\pi} \frac{(a+re^{i \theta}-1)^n rie^{i \theta}d\theta}{(re^{i \theta})^{k+1}} \\
&=\frac{1}{2\pi} \sum_{n=0}^\infty (-1)^n \int_0^{2\pi} \frac{(a-1+re^{i \theta})^n d\theta}{(re^{i \theta})^{k}}
\\
&=\frac{1}{2\pi} \sum_{n=0}^\infty (-1)^n \int_0^{2\pi} \frac{\sum_{m=0}^n \binom{n}{m} (a-1)^{n-m} (re^{i \theta})^m d\theta}{(re^{i \theta})^{k}}
\\
&=\frac{1}{2\pi} \sum_{n=0}^\infty (-1)^n \sum_{m=0}^n \binom{n}{m} (a-1)^{n-m} r^{m-k} \int_0^{2\pi} e^{i (m-k)\theta} d\theta
\\
\end{align}$$

The integral goes to zero whenever $m\ne k$. We can then assume $m=k$ without affecting the sum, leading to
$$\begin{align}
a_k&=\frac{1}{2\pi} \sum_{n=k}^\infty (-1)^n \binom{n}{k} (a-1)^{n-k}\int_0^{2\pi}  d\theta \\
&=\sum_{n=k}^\infty (-1)^n \binom{n}{k} (a-1)^{n-k}
\\
&=(-1)^k \sum_{m=0}^\infty  \binom{m+k}{k} (1-a)^m \\
&=(-1)^k a^{-k-1}
\end{align}$$

The last summation results from the kth derivation of the geometric series, which gives the formula
$$\frac 1{(1-x)^{k+1}} = \sum_{m=0}^\infty \binom{m+k}k x^m.$$

Then,
$$\begin{align}
f(z) &= \sum_{k=0}^\infty a_k (z-a)^k \\
&= \sum_{k=0}^\infty (-1)^k a^{-k-1} (z-a)^k \\
&= \frac{1}{a} \sum_{k=0}^\infty \left ( 1 - \frac{z}{a} \right )^k \\
&= \frac{1}{a} \frac{1}{1 - \left(1 - \frac{z}{a}\right)} \\
&= \frac{1}{z} \\
&= \frac{1}{(z + a) - a}
\end{align}$$

which has radius of convergence $|a|$ around $a$. If we choose $a \in U$ with $|a|>1$, then $V$ is not a subset of $U$ and is actually larger in area than $U$. The plot shows the result for $a = \tfrac{1}{2}(3+i).$

We can continue the process: select $b \in U \cup V$, recenter the power series at $b$, and determine where the new power series converges. If the region contains points not in $U \cup V$, then we will have analytically continued $f$ even further. This particular $f$ can be analytically continued to the whole punctured complex plane $\Complex \setminus \{0\}.$

In this particular case the obtained values of $f(-1)$ are the same when the successive centers have a positive imaginary part or a negative imaginary part. This is not always the case; in particular this is not the case for the complex logarithm, the antiderivative of the above function.

== Formal definition of a germ ==
The power series defined below is generalized by the idea of a germ. The general theory of analytic continuation and its generalizations is known as sheaf theory. Let

$$f(z)=\sum_{k=0}^\infty \alpha_k (z-z_0)^k$$

be a power series converging in the disk D_{r}(z_{0}), r > 0, defined by

$$D_r(z_0) = \{z \in \Complex : |z - z_0| < r\}$$.

Note that without loss of generality, here and below, we will always assume that a maximal such r was chosen, even if that r is ∞. Also note that it would be equivalent to begin with an analytic function defined on some small open set. We say that the vector

$$g = (z_0, \alpha_0, \alpha_1, \alpha_2, \ldots)$$

is a germ of f. The base g_{0} of g is z_{0}, the stem of g is (α_{0}, α_{1}, α_{2}, ...) and the top g_{1} of g is α_{0}. The top of g is the value of f at z_{0}.

Any vector g = (z_{0}, α_{0}, α_{1}, ...) is a germ if it represents a power series of an analytic function around z_{0} with some radius of convergence r > 0. Therefore, we can safely speak of the set of germs $\mathcal G$.

== The topology of the set of germs ==
Let g and h be germs. If $|h_0-g_0|<r$ where r is the radius of convergence of g and if the power series defined by g and h specify identical functions on the intersection of the two domains, then we say that h is generated by (or compatible with) g, and we write g ≥ h. This compatibility condition is neither transitive, symmetric nor antisymmetric. If we extend the relation by transitivity, we obtain a symmetric relation, which is therefore also an equivalence relation on germs (but not an ordering). This extension by transitivity is one definition of analytic continuation. The equivalence relation will be denoted $\cong$.

We can define a topology on $\mathcal G$. Let r > 0, and let

$$U_r(g) = \{h \in \mathcal G : g \ge h, |g_0 - h_0| < r\}.$$

The sets U_{r}(g), for all r > 0 and $g\in\mathcal G$ define a basis of open sets for the topology on $\mathcal G$.

A connected component of $\mathcal G$ (i.e., an equivalence class) is called a sheaf. We also note that the map defined by $\phi_g(h) = h_0 : U_r(g) \to \Complex,$ where r is the radius of convergence of g, is a chart. The set of such charts forms an atlas for $\mathcal G$, hence $\mathcal G$ is a Riemann surface. $\mathcal G$ is sometimes called the universal analytic function.

== Examples of analytic continuation ==
$$L(z) = \sum_{k=1}^\infin \frac{(-1)^{k+1}}{k}(z-1)^k$$

is a power series corresponding to the natural logarithm near z = 1. This power series can be turned into a germ

$$g=\left(1,0,1,-\frac 1 2, \frac 1 3 , - \frac 1 4 , \frac 1 5 , - \frac 1 6 , \ldots\right)$$

This germ has a radius of convergence of 1, and so there is a sheaf S corresponding to it. This is the sheaf of the logarithm function.

The uniqueness theorem for analytic functions also extends to sheaves of analytic functions: if the sheaf of an analytic function contains the zero germ (i.e., the sheaf is uniformly zero in some neighborhood) then the entire sheaf is zero. Armed with this result, we can see that if we take any germ g of the sheaf S of the logarithm function, as described above, and turn it into a power series f(z) then this function will have the property that exp(f(z)) = z. If we had decided to use a version of the inverse function theorem for analytic functions, we could construct a wide variety of inverses for the exponential map, but we would discover that they are all represented by some germ in S. In that sense, S is the "one true inverse" of the exponential map.

In older literature, sheaves of analytic functions were called multi-valued functions. See sheaf for the general concept.

== Natural boundary ==
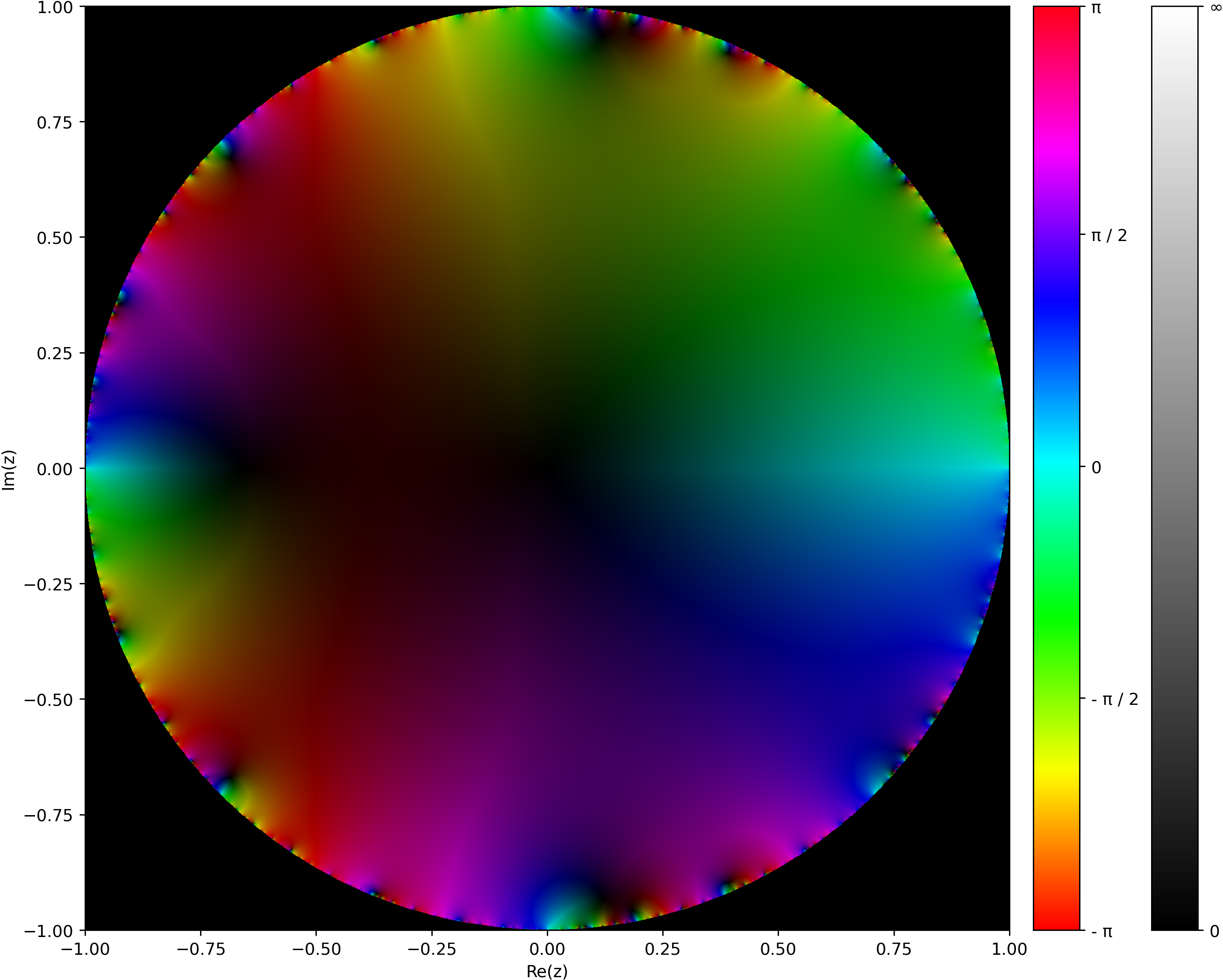
Domain coloring of the 128th partial sum of the lacunary function $\sum_{n=0}^\infty z^{2^n}$, which has a natural boundary at the unit circle.

Suppose that a power series has radius of convergence r and defines an analytic function f inside that disc. Consider points on the circle of convergence. A point for which there is a neighbourhood on which f has an analytic extension is regular, otherwise singular. The circle is a natural boundary if all its points are singular.

More generally, we may apply the definition to any open connected domain on which f is analytic, and classify the points of the boundary of the domain as regular or singular: the domain boundary is then a natural boundary if all points are singular, in which case the domain is a domain of holomorphy.

=== Example I: A function with a natural boundary at zero (the prime zeta function) ===
For $\Re(s) > 1$ we define the so-called prime zeta function, $P(s)$, to be

$$P(s) := \sum_{p\ \text{ prime}} p^{-s}.$$

This function is analogous to the summatory form of the Riemann zeta function when $\Re(s) > 1$ in so much as it is the same summatory function as $\zeta(s)$, except with indices restricted only to the prime numbers instead of taking the sum over all positive natural numbers. The prime zeta function has an analytic continuation to all complex s such that $0 < \Re(s) < 1$, a fact which follows from the expression of $P(s)$ by the logarithms of the Riemann zeta function as

$$P(s) = \sum_{n \geq 1} \mu(n)\frac{\log\zeta(ns)}{n}.$$

Since $\zeta(s)$ has a simple, non-removable pole at $s := 1$, it can then be seen that $P(s)$ has a simple pole at $s := \tfrac{1}{k}, \forall k \in \Z^{+}$. Since the set of points

$$\operatorname{Sing}_P := \left\{k^{-1} : k \in \Z^+\right\} = \left \{1, \frac{1}{2}, \frac{1}{3}, \frac{1}{4},\ldots \right \}$$

has accumulation point 0 (the limit of the sequence as $k\mapsto\infty$), we can see that zero forms a natural boundary for $P(s)$. This implies that $P(s)$ has no analytic continuation for s left of (or at) zero, i.e., there is no continuation possible for $P(s)$ when $0 \geq \Re(s)$. As a remark, this fact can be problematic if we are performing a complex contour integral over an interval whose real parts are symmetric about zero, say $I_F \subseteq \Complex \ \text{such that}\ \Re(s) \in (-C, C), \forall s \in I_F$ for some $C > 0$, where the integrand is a function with denominator that depends on $P(s)$ in an essential way.

=== Example II: A typical lacunary series (natural boundary as subsets of the unit circle) ===
For integers $c \geq 2$, we define the lacunary series of order c by the power series expansion

$$\mathcal{L}_c(z) := \sum_{n \geq 1} z^{c^n}, |z| < 1.$$

Clearly, since $c^{n+1} = c \cdot c^{n}$ there is a functional equation for $\mathcal{L}_c(z)$ for any z satisfying $|z| < 1$ given by $\mathcal{L}_c(z) = z^{c} + \mathcal{L}_c(z^c)$. It is also not difficult to see that for any integer $m \geq 1$, we have another functional equation for $\mathcal{L}_c(z)$ given by

$$\mathcal{L}_c(z) = \sum_{i=0}^{m-1} z^{c^{i}} + \mathcal{L}_c(z^{c^m}), \forall |z| < 1.$$

For any positive natural numbers c, the lacunary series function diverges at $z = 1$. We consider the question of analytic continuation of $\mathcal{L}_c(z)$ to other complex z such that $|z| > 1.$ As we shall see, for any $n \geq 1$, the function $\mathcal{L}_c(z)$ diverges at the $c^{n}$-th roots of unity. Hence, since the set formed by all such roots is dense on the boundary of the unit circle, there is no analytic continuation of $\mathcal{L}_c(z)$ to complex z whose modulus exceeds one.

The proof of this fact is generalized from a standard argument for the case where $c := 2.$ Namely, for integers $n \geq 1$, let

$$\mathcal{R}_{c,n} := \left \{z \in \mathbb{D} \cup \partial{\mathbb{D}}: z^{c^n} = 1 \right \},$$

where $\mathbb{D}$ denotes the open unit disk in the complex plane and $|\mathcal{R}_{c,n} | = c^n$, i.e., there are $c^n$ distinct complex numbers z that lie on or inside the unit circle such that $z^{c^n} = 1$. Now the key part of the proof is to use the functional equation for $\mathcal{L}_c(z)$ when $|z| < 1$ to show that

$$\forall z \in \mathcal{R}_{c,n}, \qquad \mathcal{L}_c(z) = \sum_{i=0}^{c^n-1} z^{c^i} + \mathcal{L}_c(z^{c^n}) = \sum_{i=0}^{c^n-1} z^{c^i} + \mathcal{L}_c(1) = +\infty.$$

Thus for any arc on the boundary of the unit circle, there are an infinite number of points z within this arc such that $\mathcal{L}_c(z) = \infty$. This condition is equivalent to saying that the circle $C_1 := \{z: |z| = 1\}$ forms a natural boundary for the function $\mathcal{L}_c(z)$ for any fixed choice of $c \in \Z \quad c > 1.$ Hence, there is no analytic continuation for these functions beyond the interior of the unit circle.

== Monodromy theorem ==
The monodromy theorem gives a sufficient condition for the existence of a direct analytic continuation (i.e., an extension of an analytic function to an analytic function on a bigger set).

Suppose $D\subset \Complex$ is an open set and f an analytic function on D. If G is a simply connected domain containing D, such that f has an analytic continuation along every path in G, starting from some fixed point a in D, then f has a direct analytic continuation to G.

In the above language this means that if G is a simply connected domain, and S is a sheaf whose set of base points contains G, then there exists an analytic function f on G whose germs belong to S.

== Hadamard's gap theorem ==
For a power series

$$f(z)=\sum_{k=0}^\infty a_k z^{n_k}$$

with

$$\liminf_{k\to\infty}\frac{n_{k+1}}{n_k} > 1$$

the circle of convergence is a natural boundary. Such a power series is called lacunary. This theorem has been substantially generalized by Eugène Fabry (see Fabry's gap theorem) and George Pólya.

== Fatou–Hurwitz–Pólya theorem ==
Let

$$f(z)=\sum_{k=0}^\infty \alpha_k (z-z_0)^k$$

be a power series. Then there exist ε_{k} ∈ {−1, 1} such that

$$g(z)=\sum_{k=0}^\infty \varepsilon_k\alpha_k (z-z_0)^k$$

has the convergence disc of f around z_{0} as a natural boundary.

== See also ==
- Mittag-Leffler star
- Holomorphic functional calculus
- Numerical analytic continuation
- Pólya's shire theorem
