= Charles Fabry =

French physicist (1867–1945)

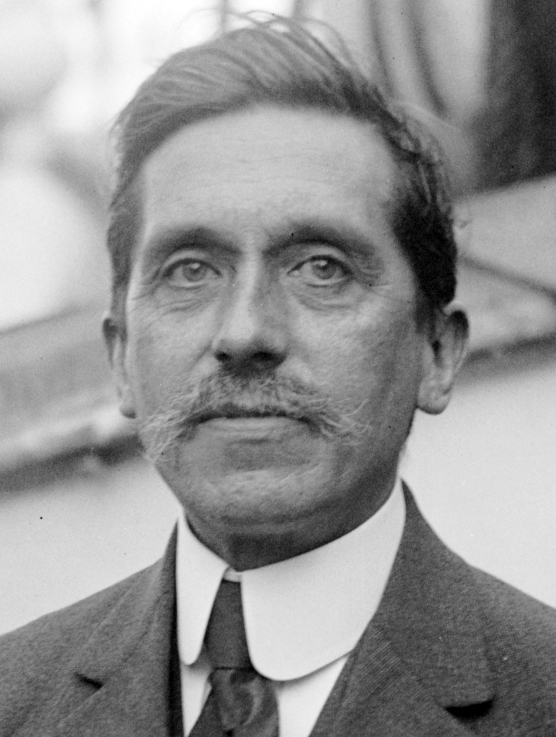
- Born: 11 June 1867; Marseille, France
- Died: 11 December 1945 (aged 78); Paris, France
- Education: École Polytechnique; University of Paris
- Known for: Fabry–Pérot interferometer Ozone layer
- Relatives: Louis Fabry (brother); Eugène Fabry (brother)
- Awards: Janssen Medal (1916); Rumford Medal (1918); Henry Draper Medal (1919); Franklin Medal (1921); Prix Jules Janssen (1929); FRS (1931)
- Scientific career
- Institutions: Sorbonne; University of Marseille; École supérieure d'optique
- Thesis: Théorie de la visibilité et de l'orientation des franges d'interférences (1892)
- Notable students: Jean Dufay; Yves Rocard; Bernard Lyot; Yan Jici; Sisir Kumar Mitra; Anil Kumar Das; Jean Cabannes; Daniel Chalonge; Mahmoud Hessabi

Marie Paul Auguste Charles Fabry ForMemRS (French: [maʁi pɔl oɡyst ʃaʁl fabʁi]; 11 June 1867 – 11 December 1945) was a French physicist working on optics. Together with Alfred Pérot he invented the Fabry–Pérot interferometer. He is also one of the co-discoverers of the ozone layer.

== Biography ==
=== Family background ===
The Fabry family originates from Bourg-Saint-Andéol in the Ardèche department. It was in this town that François-Antoine Fabry (1749–1823), a spinner in Bourg-Saint-Andéol and Charles’s great-grandfather, prepared for the entrance exam to the École Polytechnique at the end of the 18th century. He was admitted and became the first in a long line of polytechnicians. His son Auguste (1796–1877) was also admitted and received lessons from the famous physicist André-Marie Ampère.

Auguste’s son, also named Charles, married Marie Estrangin, from a prominent Marseille family close to the playwright Edmond Rostand. Together, they had five children: Auguste, Eugène Fabry, Louis Fabry, Charles, and Pierre, several of whom had distinguished careers. Eugène, born in 1856, was a polytechnician and Doctor of Mathematical Sciences, a tobacco engineer, an associate professor at the lycées of Tarbes, Carcassonne, and Tours, a lecturer at the Faculties of Sciences in Rennes and Nancy, a professor in Montpellier and Marseille, and an examiner at the École Polytechnique. Louis, born in 1862, also a polytechnician with degrees in mathematics and physics, was an astronomer at the Paris Observatory (1884–1887), in Nice (1887–1890), and then in Marseille until his retirement in 1924. Auguste, born in 1855, earned a doctorate in law and became a lawyer in Marseille before joining the judiciary. He served as deputy public prosecutor and examining magistrate in Tunis, vice-president, prosecutor, president, and attorney general in Caen, finally becoming first president and then counselor at the French Court of Cassation.

=== Early years and education ===
Marie Paul Auguste Charles Fabry was born in Marseille on 11 June 1867. From a young age, he showed a keen interest in science. He excelled at the Lycée de Marseille, now known as Lycée Thiers. At 18, he entered the École Polytechnique in Paris in 1885, ranked 17th, and graduated in 1887, ranked 23rd, but chose to resign. He then returned to Marseille to study at the Faculty of Sciences, where he prepared for the physics agrégation, placing third in 1889, behind Henri Abraham (2nd) and Bernard Brunhes (1st).

=== Teaching and research in southern France ===
Fabry began his career teaching physics in high schools. He was appointed successively in Pau in 1889, Nevers in 1890, Bordeaux in 1892, the Lycée Thiers in Marseille in January 1893, and finally in Paris in October of the same year. At the same time, he pursued a Doctorate of Science under the supervision of Jules Macé de Lepinay, professor of physics at the Université d'Aix-Marseille. In 1892, he defended his thesis at the Faculté des Sciences de Paris, titled Theory of the Visibility and Orientation of Interference Fringes.

In 1894, he was appointed maître de conférences at the Faculté des Sciences de l'Université de Marseille for the P.C.N. certificate. He joined the laboratory of Jules Macé de Lepinay and succeeded Alfred Perot in 1904 as professor of industrial physics. Pierre Sève would later replace him when he moved to Paris.

Fabry at the Fourth Conference International Union for Cooperation in Solar Research at Mount Wilson Observatory, 1910

In collaboration with Henri Buisson, his successor as maître de conférences, and Alfred Perot, he helped develop the Fabry–Perot interferometer, which he notably used in 1913 to demonstrate the existence of the ozone layer, previously only hypothesized, and to measure its distribution in the atmosphere. Jean Cabannes worked in his laboratory while preparing his doctoral thesis. Fabry also experimentally confirmed the Doppler–Fizeau effect in optics.

=== The Great War and the creation of the Institut d’Optique ===
Still in Marseille at the outbreak of war in summer 1914, Charles Fabry was invited to contribute to the work of the Directorate of Inventions for National Defense, created on the initiative of Paul Painlevé.

Shortly after the United States entered the war, Fabry was chosen to lead the French Scientific Mission to the United States, tasked with exchanging information, intelligence, and technical and scientific advances critical to the war effort. The first group of mission members left Bordeaux on 19 May 1917, and included Charles Fabry, Armand de Gramont, Henri Abraham and a young telegraph operator named Paternot, the secretary Dupouey, as well as Sir Ernest Rutherford and Commander Cyprian Bridge, sent by the British Army. In the U.S., they were welcomed by members of the National Research Council, including George Ellery Hale and Robert Millikan. Later, Victor Grignard and Giorgio Abetti joined the mission. Together, they explored numerous issues with their American counterparts, including submarine defense. On 13 July 1917, some members visited Thomas Edison’s laboratory in West Orange, New Jersey.

Fabry returned to France on 12 August and wrote his report before resuming work at his Marseille laboratory.

In early 1919, Fabry accepted to become the first Director General of the Institut d'optique théorique et appliquée, a project initiated in 1916 by Armand de Gramont and supported by Paul Painlevé.

He officially took up the position in 1921, when he left Marseille and returned to Paris as chair of physics at the Faculty of Science, University of Paris, succeeding Edmond Bouty. He also became director of the physics teaching laboratory, working with Eugène Darmois, Louis Décombe, and later François Bedeau.

=== Other positions ===
In 1927, he was appointed professor at the École Polytechnique, following the death of Alfred Perot, and was elected to the French Academy of Sciences, succeeding Daniel Berthelot (Charles Fabry received 51 votes; Paul Langevin, Henri Abraham, and Georges Sagnac each received one vote).

In 1937, he co-founded the Société de Recherches et Études en Optique et Sciences Connexes (REOSC, now part of the Safran Group) with Henri Chrétien, Georges Guadet, and André Bayle. Consequently, he left his positions at the Faculté des Sciences de Paris and the École Polytechnique, where he was succeeded by Louis Leprince-Ringuet.

He served as honorary president of the French Photographic Society (1935–1937), succeeding Georges Perrier, and as president of the French Physical Society in 1924. From 1931 to 1933, he was also president of the French Astronomical Society. In 1931, he was elected a foreign member of the Royal Society.

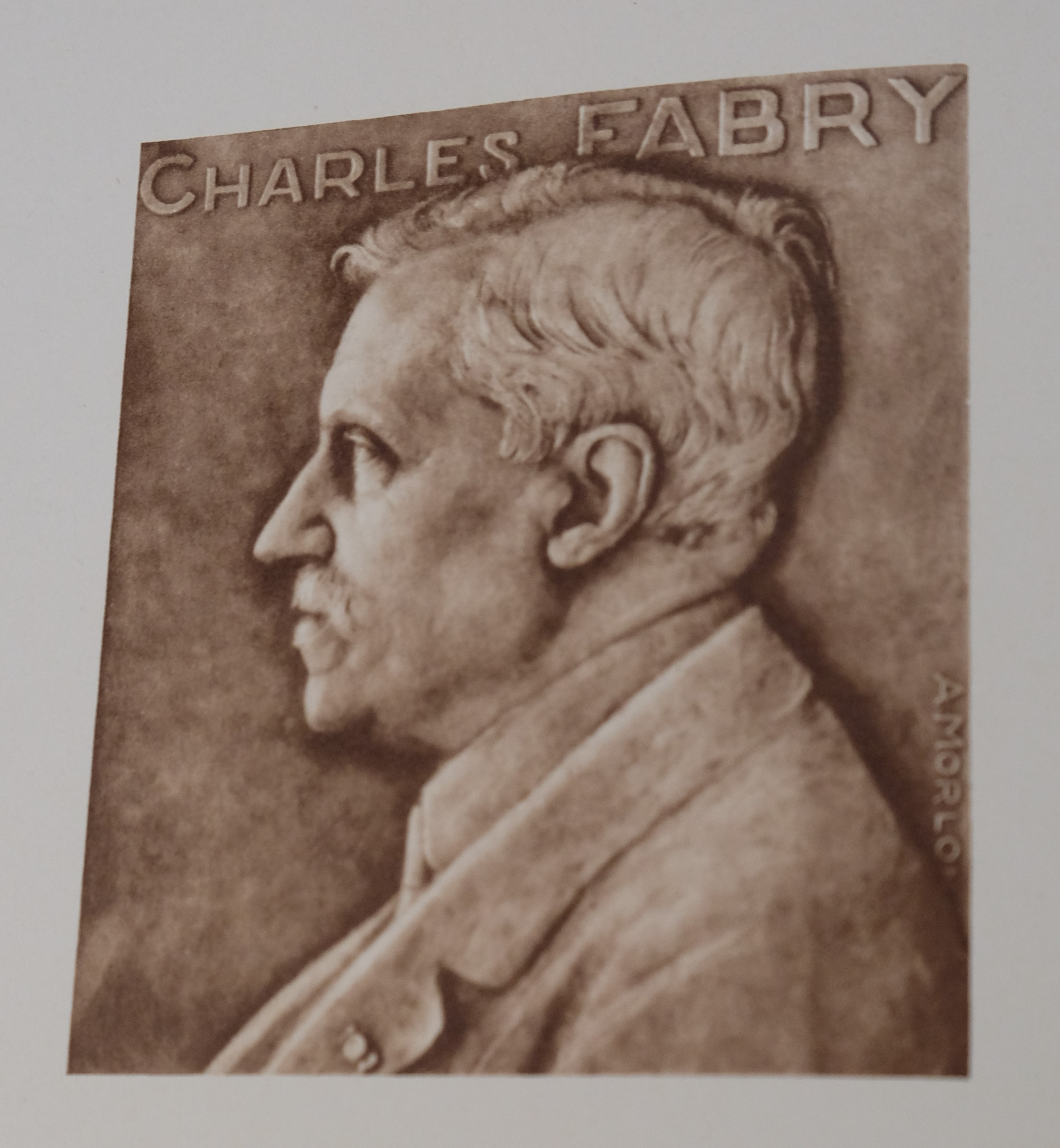
Portrait of Fabry in a 1938 copy of "Oeuvres Choisies Publiées à l'Occasion de son Jubilé Scientifique"

Upon reaching retirement age, a scientific jubilee was organized in his honor on 3 December 1937 at the Sorbonne.

=== Final years: World War II and the Cahiers de Physique ===
During the early months of the war, part of the laboratories of the Institut d'Optique, of which Charles Fabry was still General Director, conducted research relevant to national defense. Supported by the French Navy, which encouraged a relocation to the outskirts of Toulon, Fabry left Paris on 11 June 1940 and moved to the south of France, bringing along some staff and equipment from the Institut d'Optique's research laboratories. The new site was established at the Hôtel des Palmiers in Les Lecques, in Saint-Cyr-sur-Mer, where Fabry also owned a residence.

Following the takeover of the French Physical Society and its main scientific journal, Journal de Physique et le Radium, by scientists aligned with the Vichy regime—resulting in the arrest of publication director Paul Langevin and the replacement of editorial committee president Jean Langevin for refusing to remove articles by "non-Aryan" authors—Fabry decided to launch, with Georges Guadet, the new publication Cahiers de Physique. The journal, whose first issue appeared in June 1941, welcomed contributions from physicists in both the southern (unoccupied) and northern (occupied) zones of France. Fabry was the president of the editorial committee, whose members included Henri Abraham, Albert Arnulf, Henri Buisson, Henri Chrétien, Jean Bossler, Georges Déjardin, Jean Dufay, Max Morand, Louis Leprince-Ringuet, Louis Lumière, among others.

The Cahiers de Physique also published obituaries of physicists who had died during the war, including Fernand Holweck and Jacques Solomon.

On 16 January 1943, he delivered the inaugural address for the creation of the Mediterranean Section of the Société française de physique at the Faculty of Sciences of Marseille. He co-founded the section with Henri Abraham and Louis Lumière. Several meetings of this section took place in Marseille and Montpellier during the war.

After the Liberation, Fabry returned permanently to Paris and resumed his duties as General Director of the Institut d’Optique. He died on 11 December 1945 after a long illness. His final text, a detailed obituary of his friend Henri Abraham, who died in deportation at Auschwitz in late 1943, appeared in the Cahiers de Physique in June 1947.

== Awards and honors ==
For his important scientific achievements he received the Rumford Medal from the Royal Society of London in 1918. In the United States his work was recognized by the Henry Draper Medal from the National Academy of Sciences (1919) and the Franklin Medal from the Franklin Institute (1921). In 1927 he was elected to the French Academy of Sciences. In 1929, he received the Prix Jules Janssen, the highest award of the Société astronomique de France, the French astronomical society. In 1933, The Optical Society elected him an Honorary Member.

Asteroid 410619 Fabry is named after him.

== Legacy ==
- The Charles Fabry Laboratory (Laboratoire Charles Fabry), the historical successor to the research and testing laboratories of the Institut d'Optique, is today a joint research unit (UMR 8501) affiliated with the Institut d'Optique Graduate School, CNRS, and the University of Paris-Saclay.
- Since 1970, the Société française d'optique has awarded the **Fabry–de Gramont Prize** to a young physicist (under 40 years old), internationally recognized, whose research is distinguished by its quality, originality, and potential impact.

== Notable publications ==
=== Scientific articles ===
- Charles Fabry. "Théorie de la visibilité et de l’orientation des franges d’interférence.", J. Phys. Theor. Appl., 1892, 1 (1), pp. 313–332.
- Charles Fabry. "Remarques sur la température d’équilibre d’un corps exposé à un rayonnement." J. Phys. Theor. Appl., 1916, 6 (1), pp. 207–218.

=== Physics textbooks ===
- Éléments de thermodynamique, A. Colin, 8th ed., 1952.
- Les Radiations, A. Colin, 1945.
- Propagation de la chaleur, A. Colin, 1942.
- Éléments d'électricité, A. Colin, 1941.
- Physique et astrophysique, Flammarion, Bibliothèque de philosophie scientifique, 1935.
- Cours de physique de l'École polytechnique, Gauthier-Villars, 1933.
- Optique, Presses Universitaires de France, 3rd ed., 1929.
- Introduction à l'étude de l'optique appliquée, Éd. de la Revue d’optique théorique et instrumentale, 1928.
- Leçons de photométrie professées à l’Institut d’optique théorique et appliquée, Éd. de la Revue d’optique théorique et instrumentale, 1924.
- Leçons élémentaires d'acoustique et d'optique à l’usage des candidats au certificat d’études physiques, chimiques et naturelles, Gauthier-Villars, 1898.
