= Eugène Fabry =

French physicist (1867–1945)

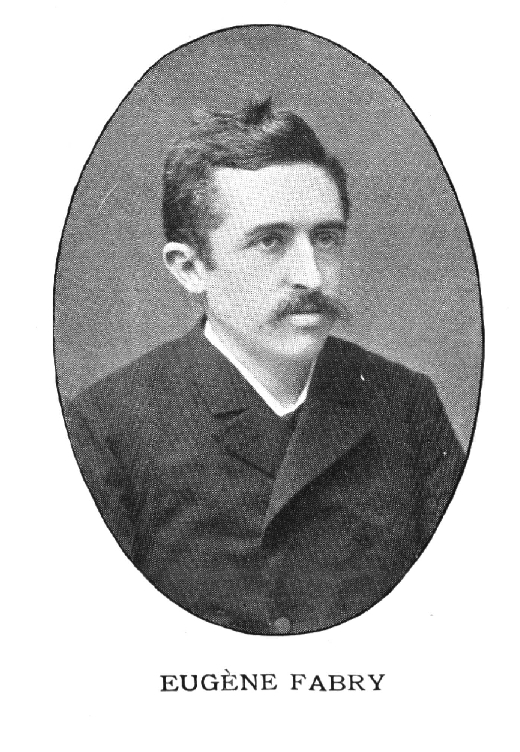
- Born: 16 October 1856; Marseille, France
- Died: 6 October 1944 (aged 87); Mazargues, France
- Education: Lycée Thiers; École polytechnique
- Known for: Fabry gap theorem
- Scientific career
- Thesis: Sur les intégrales des équations différentielles linéaires à coefficients rationnels (1885)

Charles Eugène Fabry (French: [øʒɛn fabʁi]; 16 October 1856 – 6 October 1944) was a French mathematician. Fabry is best known for studying the singularities of analytic functions, including proving the Fabry gap theorem.

== Biography ==
Eugène Fabry, born in Marseille, was the second of five sons in his family. His brothers included physicist Charles Fabry and astronomer Louis Fabry.

He became professor of analysis at Aix-Marseille University and the University of Montpellier, and a corresponding member of the French Academy of Sciences.

He was the 1930 recipient of the Prix Francoeur of the French Academy of Sciences, "for his work on the singularities of analytical functions".
