= Funda Ergun =

Turkish and American computer science

Ayşe Funda Ergün is a Turkish and American theoretical computer scientist, a professor of computer science at Indiana University Bloomington, and the chair of ACM SIGACT, the Association for Computing Machinery Special Interest Group on Algorithms and Computation Theory. Her research interests include streaming algorithms, sublinear algorithms, and applications of computational biology to cancer.

Ergun has a bachelor's degree in computer science from Bilkent University. She completed a Ph.D. at Cornell University in 1998, with the dissertation General Methods for Extending the Scope of Self-Testing and Result-Checking supervised by Ronitt Rubinfeld. She joined Simon Fraser University in British Columbia, Canada as an assistant professor in 2004, and remained there as an associate and full professor until 2013, when she moved to her present position at Indiana University. She was also a program director at the National Science Foundation from 2019 to 2023.

She was elected as chair of ACM SIGACT for the 2024–2027 term.
