= Felipe Cucker =

Uruguayan mathematician (born 1958)

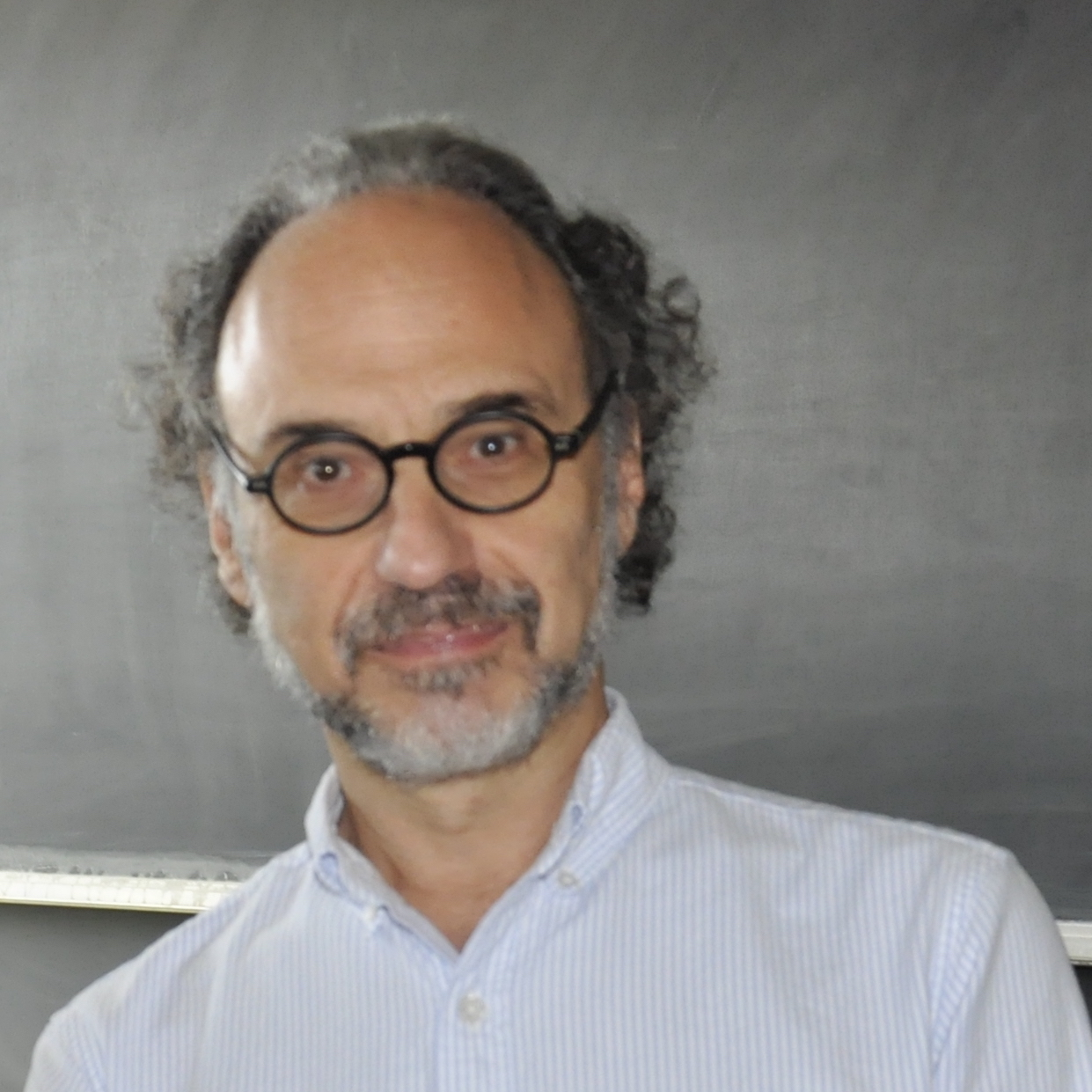
- Felipe Cucker in November 2019
- Born: Juan Felipe Cucker Farkas; 6 May 1958 (age 68); Montevideo, Uruguay
- Education: University of Barcelona; University of Cantabria; University of Rennes 1
- Known for: Complexity and real computation Condition number Foundations of computational mathematics
- Scientific career
- Fields: Mathematics; Theoretical computer science
- Workplaces: City University of Hong Kong; Pompeu Fabra University

Juan Felipe Cucker Farkas (born 1958) is an Uruguayan mathematician and theoretical computer scientist who has done research into the complexity theory of the Blum–Shub–Smale computational model and the complexity of numerical algorithms in linear programming and numerical algebraic geometry.

== Biography ==
Cucker was born in Montevideo in 1958. Due to the situation in Uruguay in the 70s, he emigrated to Spain to study the bachelor of mathematics at the University of Barcelona, which he completed in 1983. He obtained his PhD degree at the University of Cantabria and University of Rennes 1 in 1986 under the supervision Tomás Recio and Michel Coste. His thesis was about Nash functions on real algebraic varieties.

From 1987 to 1992 Cucker was professor at the Polytechnic University of Catalonia.

In 1992 Cucker became professor at the recently created Pompeu Fabra University. In 1995 he was promoted to chair professor at this university.

In 1993 he organized the workshop Continuous Algorithms and Complexity at the Centre de Recerca Matemàtica in Barcelona where he started his long-term collaboration with Lenore Blum, Michael Shub, and Steve Smale. In 1996 he moved with them to the City University of Hong Kong to write the book Complexity and Real Computation. Although this was intended as a temporal position, Cucker would stay in Hong Kong and became an associate professor of this university in 1998, full professor in 2003, and chair professor in 2006.

Cucker was one of the founders of the nonprofit association Foundations of Computational Mathematics, of which he has been a member of the board of directors since its creation in 1995 until 2017. Additionally, Cucker was Chair of this society from 2008 to 2011 and Editor-in-Chief of its journal from 2011 to 2017.

In 2006 Cucker was named foreign member of the Royal Academy of Sciences and Arts of Barcelona.

From 2017 to 2019 Cucker was Einstein Visiting Fellow of the Berlin Mathematical School and Technische Universität Berlin.

In 2019, the conference Complexity of numerical computation: A conference in honor of Felipe Cucker was organised at the Technische Universität Berlin in Berlin celebrating his work.

Since 2018 he is Head of the Mathematics Department at City University of Hong Kong.

== Work ==
During the 90s, he worked in the complexity classes that appear when dealing with the Blum–Shub–Smale machine. In 1998, he co-authored one of the fundamental books in this topic, Complexity and Real Computation, together with Lenore Blum, Michael Shub, and Steve Smale.

In the 2000s he focused on the analysis of numerical algorithms in linear programming. Together with Dennis Cheung he introduced the notions of the GCC condition number in linear programming.

In 2007 together with Steve Smale he proposed the so-called Cucker-Smale flocking model. This model, which has received extensive attention in mathematics and other fields, plays an important role in the mathematical study of flocking dynamics.

In 2011 together with Peter Bürgisser he contributed to the solution of Smale's 17th problem.

In 2013 Cucker won an Honorable Mention in the Category of Mathematics of the PROSE Awards for his book Manifold Mirrors: The Crossing Paths of the Arts and Mathematics, which dealt with mathematics and art.

== Selected publications ==
- Blum, Lenore; Cucker, Felipe; Shub, Michael; Smale, Steve (1998). Complexity and Real Computation. New York: Springer-Verlag. doi:10.1007/978-1-4612-0701-6. ISBN 0-387-98281-7. MR 1479636. S2CID 12510680.
- Cheung, Dennis; Cucker, Felipe (2001). "A new condition number for linear programming". Mathematical Programming. 91 (1): 163–174. doi:10.1007/s101070100237. ISSN 0025-5610. MR 1865268. S2CID 8810450.
- Cucker, Felipe; Smale, Steve (2002). "On the mathematical foundations of learning". Bulletin of the American Mathematical Society. New Series. 39 (1): 1–49. doi:10.1090/S0273-0979-01-00923-5. ISSN 0273-0979. MR 1864085.
- Cheung, Dennis; Cucker, Felipe (2004). "Solving linear programs with finite precision. I. Condition numbers and random programs". Mathematical Programming. 99 (1): 175–196. doi:10.1007/s10107-003-0393-7. ISSN 0025-5610. MR 2032022. S2CID 43328765.
- Cucker, Felipe; Smale, Steve (2007). "Emergent behavior in flocks". IEEE Transactions on Automatic Control. 52 (5): 852–862. Bibcode:2007ITAC...52..852C. doi:10.1109/TAC.2007.895842. ISSN 0018-9286. MR 2324245. S2CID 206590734.
- Bürgisser, Peter; Cucker, Felipe (2011). "On a problem posed by Steve Smale". Annals of Mathematics. Second Series. 174 (3): 1785–1836. arXiv:0909.2114. doi:10.4007/annals.2011.174.3.8. ISSN 0003-486X. MR 2846491. S2CID 706015.
- Bürgisser, Peter; Cucker, Felipe (2013). Condition. The Geometry of Numerical Algorithms. Grundlehren der Mathematischen Wissenschaften. Vol. 349. Heidelberg: Springer-Verlag. doi:10.1007/978-3-642-38896-5. ISBN 978-3-642-38895-8. MR 3098452.
- Cucker, Felipe (2013). Manifold Mirrors: The Crossing Paths of the Arts and Mathematics. Cambridge: Cambridge University Press. ISBN 978-0-521-72876-8. MR 3088936.
