= Acta Numerica =

- Discipline: Numerical analysis
- Language: English
- Edited by: Arieh Iserles

Publication details
- History: 1992–present
- Publisher: Cambridge University Press
- Frequency: Annual

Standard abbreviations
- ISO 4: Acta Numer.

Indexing
- CODEN: ANUMFU
- ISSN: 0962-4929 (print); 1474-0508 (web)
- LCCN: 92657349
- OCLC no.: 49342645

Links
- Journal homepage; Online access; Online archive

Acta Numerica is a mathematics journal publishing research on numerical analysis. It was established in 1992 to publish widely accessible summaries of recent advances in the field. One volume is published each year, consisting of review and survey articles from authors invited by the journal's editorial board.

The journal is indexed by Mathematical Reviews and Zentralblatt MATH. During the period of 2004–2009, it had an MCQ of 3.43, the highest of all journals indexed by Mathematical Reviews over that period of time.

== Similar Journals ==
- Mathematics of Computation (published by the American Mathematical Society)
- Journal of Computational and Applied Mathematics
- BIT Numerical Mathematics
- Numerische Mathematik
- Journals from the Society for Industrial and Applied Mathematics
  - SIAM Journal on Numerical Analysis
  - SIAM Journal on Scientific Computing
