= Robert L. Devaney =

American mathematician (1948–2025)

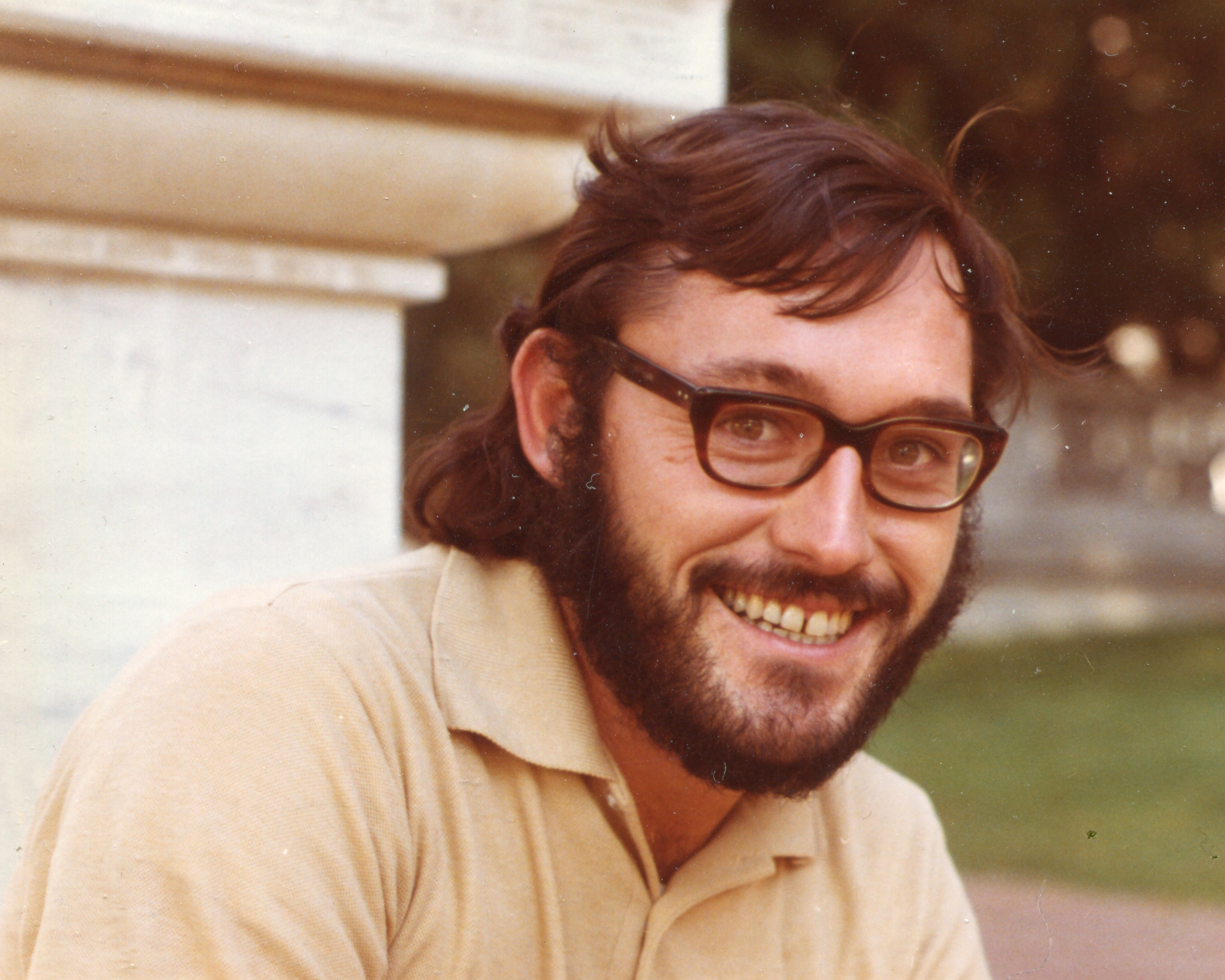
- Devaney in 1973
- Born: April 9, 1948; Lawrence, Massachusetts, U.S.
- Died: November 16, 2025 (aged 77); Boston, Massachusetts, U.S.
- Education: College of the Holy Cross (BA); University of California, Berkeley (PhD)
- Scientific career
- Fields: Mathematics; Chaos theory
- Workplaces: Northwestern University; Tufts University; Boston University
- Thesis: Reversible diffeomorphisms and flows (1973)
- Doctoral advisor: Stephen Smale

President of the Mathematical Association of America
- In office 2013–2015
- Preceded by: Paul M. Zorn
- Succeeded by: Francis Su

Robert Luke Devaney (April 9, 1948 – November 16, 2025) was an American mathematician known for his research in dynamical systems theory. He was the Feld Family Professor of Teaching Excellence at Boston University and served as the president of the Mathematical Association of America from 2013 to 2015.

Devaney's research spanned dynamical systems, celestial mechanics, and complex dynamics. He was among the first mathematicians to systematically study the dynamics of transcendental entire functions, and the fractal structures he described in their Julia sets became known as Devaney hairs.

== Biography ==
=== Early life and education ===
Devaney was born in Lawrence, Massachusetts, on April 9, 1948. He was raised in nearby Methuen, and attended Central Catholic High School.

After high school, Devaney graduated from the College of the Holy Cross in Worcester, Massachusetts, with a Bachelor of Arts in mathematics with highest honors in 1969. As an undergraduate at Holy Cross, he was named the Fenwick Scholar, the college's highest academic honor. His senior undergraduate thesis, "Lens Spaces as Coset Spaces", was published in the fifth volume of the Pi Mu Epsilon Journal. He then earned his Ph.D. in mathematics in 1973 from the University of California, Berkeley, under Fields medalist Stephen Smale. His doctoral dissertation was titled, "Reversible diffeomorphisms and flows".

=== Academic career ===
After completing his doctorate, Devaney was a postdoctoral fellow at Northwestern University from 1974 to 1976 and an assistant professor of mathematics at Tufts University from 1976 to 1980. During the spring semester of 1980, he was a visiting assistant professor at the University of Maryland, College Park, and that year he joined Boston University as an associate professor of mathematics. He served as chair of Boston University's Department of Mathematics from 1983 to 1986 and became a full professor there in 1986. During his career at Boston University, he also held visiting appointments at the Mathematical Sciences Research Institute in 1984 and 1989, Paris-Sud University and the Max Planck Institute for Mathematics in 1988, the Centre de Recerca Matemàtica in 2001, and the University of Barcelona in 2008.

Beginning in 1989, Devaney directed the National Science Foundation-sponsored Dynamical Systems and Technology Project at Boston University. The project was designed to help secondary-school and college mathematics teachers introduce contemporary subjects including chaos, fractals, and dynamical systems into their classrooms and to use technology in teaching those subjects. He also co-directed the Boston University Ordinary Differential Equations Project with mathematicians Paul Blanchard and Glen R. Hall; originally funded by two NSF grants, the project sought to incorporate modern dynamical-systems theory into the traditional sophomore-level course in ordinary differential equations and produced a textbook based on that approach. Outside academia, he served as a "chaos consultant" for theatrical productions of Arcadia and as a mathematical consultant for the 2007 production of the film 21.

In 2010, Boston University named Devaney its inaugural Feld Family Professor of Teaching Excellence. He then served as president of the Mathematical Association of America from 2013 to 2015. He retired from Boston University in 2018, becoming a professor emeritus of mathematics there.

Devaney died on November 16, 2025, at the age of 77.

== Mathematical research ==
Devaney is known for formulating a simple and widely used definition of chaotic systems, one that does not need advanced concepts such as measure theory. In his 1989 book An Introduction to Chaotic Dynamical Systems, Devaney defined a system to be chaotic if it has sensitive dependence on initial conditions, it is topologically transitive (for any two open sets, some points from one set will eventually hit the other set), and its periodic orbits form a dense set. Later, it was observed that this definition is redundant: sensitive dependence on initial conditions follows automatically as a mathematical consequence of the other two properties.

Devaney hairs, a fractal structure in certain Julia sets, are named after Devaney, who was the first to investigate them.

== Awards and honors ==
In 1995, Devaney won the Deborah and Franklin Tepper Haimo Award for Distinguished University Teaching of the Mathematical Association of America. In 2002, Devaney won the National Science Foundation Director's Award for Distinguished Teaching Scholars.

In 2008, a conference in honor of Devaney's 60th birthday was held in Tossa de Mar, Spain. The papers from the conference were published in a special issue of the Journal of Difference Equations and Applications in 2010, also honoring Devaney.

In 2012, he became one of the inaugurals fellows of the American Mathematical Society.

== Selected publications ==
Books

Devaney is the author of books on fractals and dynamical systems including:

- An Introduction to Chaotic Dynamical Systems (Benjamin/Cummings 1986; 2nd ed., Addison-Wesley, 1989; reprinted by Westview Press, 2003)
- The Science of Fractal Images (with Barnsley, Mandelbrot, Peitgen, Saupe, and Voss, Springer-Verlag, 1988)
- Chaos, Fractals, and Dynamics: Computer Experiments in Mathematics (Addison-Wesley, 1990)
- A First Course in Chaotic Dynamical Systems: Theory and Experiment (Addison-Wesley, 1992)
- Fractals: A Tool Kit of Dynamics Activities (with J. Choate and A. Foster, Key Curriculum Press, 1999)
- Iteration: A Tool Kit of Dynamics Activities (with J. Choate and A. Foster, Key Curriculum Press, 1999)
- Chaos: A Tool Kit of Dynamics Activities (with J. Choate, Key Curriculum Press, 2000)
- The Mandelbrot and Julia Sets: A Tool Kit of Dynamics Activities (Key Curriculum Press, 2000)
- Differential Equations (with P. Blanchard and G. R. Hall, 3rd ed., Brooks/Cole, 2005)
- Differential Equations, Dynamical Systems, and an Introduction to Chaos (with Morris Hirsch and Stephen Smale, 2nd ed., Academic Press, 2004; 3rd ed., Academic Press, 2013)

Research papers

Some of the more highly cited of Devaney's research publications include:

- Devaney, Robert L. (1976), "Homoclinic orbits in Hamiltonian systems", Journal of Differential Equations, 21 (2): 431–438, Bibcode:1976JDE....21..431D, doi:10.1016/0022-0396(76)90130-3, MR 0442990.
- Devaney, Robert L. (1976), "Reversible diffeomorphisms and flows", Transactions of the American Mathematical Society, 218: 89–113, doi:10.2307/1997429, JSTOR 1997429, MR 0402815.
- Devaney, Robert L. (1980), "Triple collision in the planar isosceles three-body problem", Inventiones Mathematicae, 60 (3): 249–267, Bibcode:1980InMat..60..249D, doi:10.1007/BF01390017, MR 0586428, S2CID 120330839.
- Devaney, Robert L.; Krych, Michał (1984), "Dynamics of exp(z)", Ergodic Theory and Dynamical Systems, 4 (1): 35–52, doi:10.1017/S014338570000225X, MR 0758892.
