= Angela Kunoth =

German mathematician

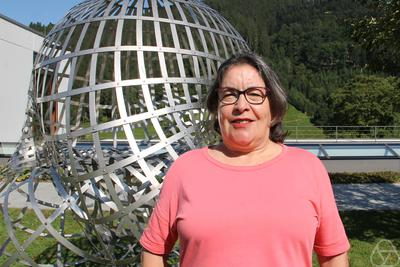
Kunoth at Oberwolfach in 2025

Angela Kunoth (born 22 June 1963) is a German mathematician specializing in the numerical analysis of partial differential equations. She is a professor of mathematics at the University of Cologne, and the editor-in-chief of SIAM Journal on Numerical Analysis.

== Education and career ==
Kunoth studied mathematics at Bielefeld University beginning in 1982, and earned a diploma there in 1990. After visiting the University of South Carolina as a Fulbright Scholar, she completed a doctorate (Dr. rer. nat.) at the Free University of Berlin in 1994. Her dissertation, Multilevel Preconditioning, was supervised by Wolfgang Dahmen.

After research positions at SINTEF in Norway, at the Weierstrass Institute in Berlin, at Texas A&M University, and at RWTH Aachen University, she became an associate professor at the University of Bonn in 1999, and earned a habilitation through RWTH Aachen in 2000 with the habilitation thesis Wavelet Methods for Minimization Problems Involving Elliptic Partial Differential Equations. She moved to Paderborn University as a full professor and chair of complex systems in 2007, and at Paderborn served as director of the mathematical institute and vice-dean of the faculty for electrotechnics from 2010 to 2012. She moved again to the University of Cologne as professor and chair for applied mathematics in 2013.

Kunoth was elected to the 2023 Class of SIAM Fellows.

== Book ==
Kunoth is the author of the monograph Wavelet Methods — Elliptic Boundary Value Problems and Control Problems (Springer, 2001), a book version of her habilitation thesis.
