= Peter Bürgisser =

Swiss mathematician and theoretical computer scientist

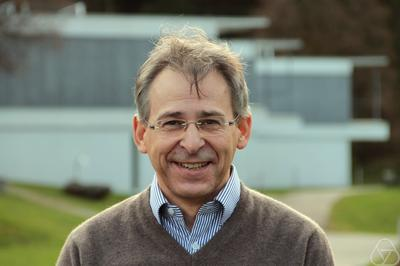
- Bürgisser at Oberwolfach in 2015
- Born: March 1962 (age 64); Zürich
- Education: University of Konstanz
- Known for: Computational complexity theory
- Awards: AMS Fellow
- Scientific career
- Fields: Mathematics; Computer Science
- Workplaces: Technische Universität Berlin; University of Paderborn
- Doctoral advisor: Volker Strassen

Peter Bürgisser (born 1962) is a Swiss mathematician and theoretical computer scientist who deals with algorithmic algebra and algebraic complexity theory.

== Education and career ==
Bürgisser received in 1990 his doctorate from the University of Konstanz with thesis Degenerationsordnung und Trägerfunktional bilinearer Abbildungen under the supervision of Volker Strassen. Bürgisser was a postdoc at the University of Bonn from 1991 to 1993 and then at the University of Zürich. He was a professor at the University of Paderborn and since 2013 a professor at Technische Universität Berlin (TU Berlin).

His research deals with efficient algorithms for the solution of algebraic problems and lower bounds in the complexity of algebraic problems, as well as with symbolic and numerical algorithms and the probabilistic analysis of numerical algorithms.

With Felipe Cucker in 2011 he contributed to the solution of Smale's Problem No. 17.

Bürgisser was a visiting scholar at the Simons Institute for the Theory of Computing in Berkeley. He was also a visiting scholar at ETH Zurich.

In 2010, he was an invited speaker with talk Smoothed Analysis of Condition Numbers at the International Congress of Mathematicians in Hyderabad. He was a plenary speaker at the 2008 conference of the organization Foundations of Computational Mathematics (FoCM) in Hong Kong and organized workshops on complexity theory at the 2005, 2008 and 2011 workshops and in the 2009 and 2012 Oberwolfach workshops. He was elected a Fellow of the American Mathematical Society in 2012.

He is a member of the editorial staff of Foundations of Computational Mathematics.

In 2018 he was awarded an ERC Advanced Grant.

== Further Activities ==
In Bürgisser`s youth, he acted in four short-films by his school-mate Roger Steinmann as lead-actor. 'Die Flutkatastrophe' and 'Die Türe' were aired in the Swiss national TV DRS, the latter accompanied with an interview by Bürgisser.

== Selected publications ==
- with Cucker, Felipe (2013). Condition – The Geometry of Numerical Algorithms. Grundlehren der mathematischen Wissenschaften. Vol. 349. Springer Berlin, Heidelberg. doi:10.1007/978-3-642-38896-5. ISBN 978-3-642-38895-8.
- Bürgisser, Peter (2000). Completeness and Reduction in Algebraic Complexity Theory. Algorithms and Computation in Mathematics. Vol. 7. Springer Berlin, Heidelberg. doi:10.1007/978-3-662-04179-6. ISBN 978-3-540-66752-0.
- with Michael Clausen and Amin Shokrollahi: Algebraic Complexity Theory, Grundlehren der mathematischen Wissenschaften 315, Springer 1997
