= Lenore Blum =

USA computer scientist and mathematician

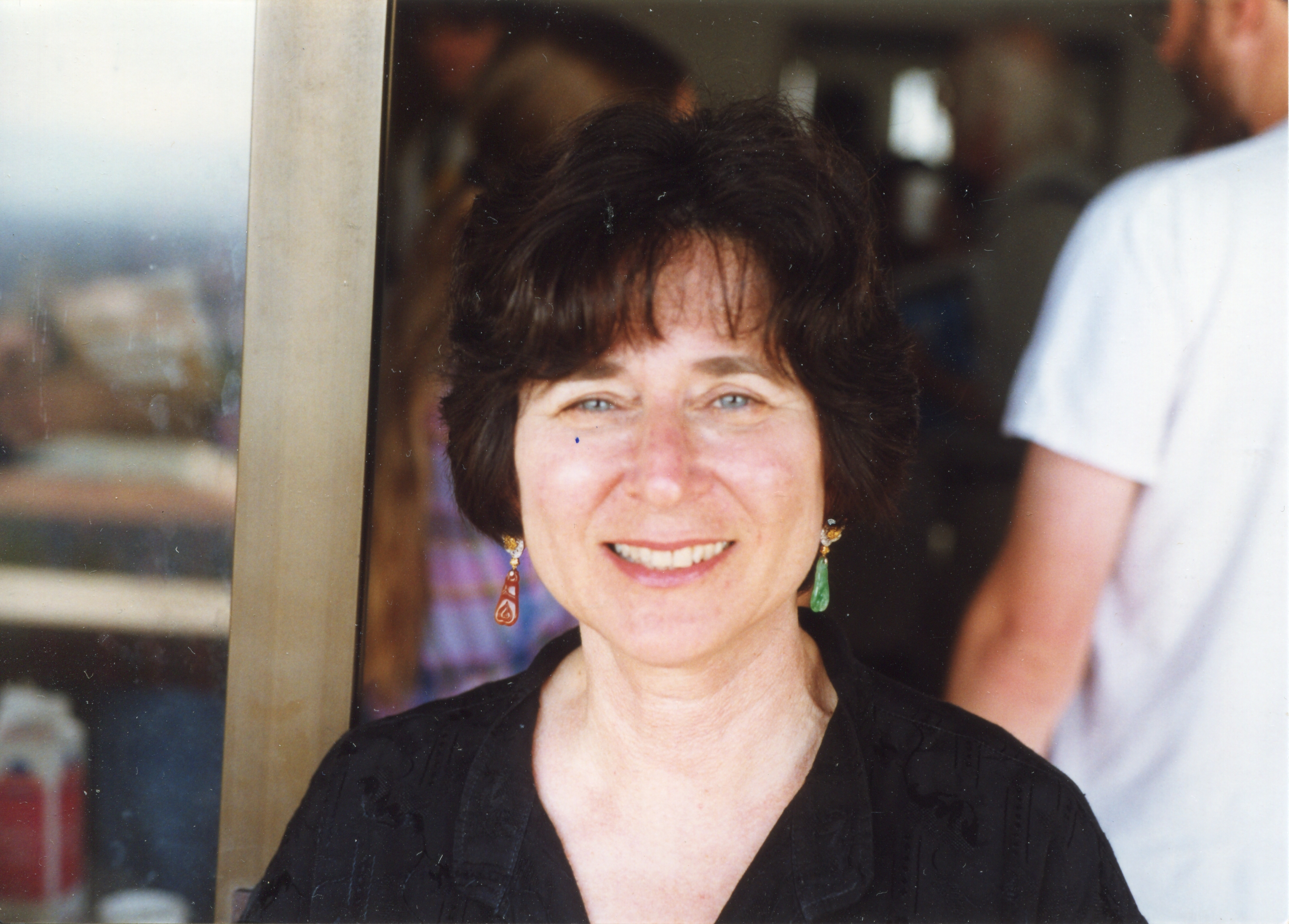
- Blum in 1998
- Born: Lenore Carol Epstein; December 18, 1942 (age 83); New York City, U.S.
- Education: Simmons College (BS); Massachusetts Institute of Technology (PhD)
- Known for: Blum Blum Shub pseudorandom number generator; Blum–Shub–Smale machine
- Spouse: Manuel Blum
- Children: Avrim Blum
- Awards: AAAS Fellow (1979); Noether Lecture (2002); PAESMEM (2005)
- Scientific career
- Fields: Computer science
- Thesis: Generalized Algebraic Theories: A Model Theoretic Approach (1968)
- Doctoral advisor: Gerald Sacks
- Doctoral students: Carol Frieze

Lenore Carol Blum (née Epstein; born December 18, 1942) is an American computer scientist and mathematician who has made contributions to the theories of real number computation, cryptography, and pseudorandom number generation. She was a distinguished career professor of computer science at Carnegie Mellon University until 2019 and is currently a professor in residence at the University of California, Berkeley. She is also known for her efforts to increase diversity in mathematics and computer science.

== Early life and education ==
Blum was born to a Jewish family in New York City, where her mother was a science teacher. They moved to Venezuela when Blum was nine. After graduating from her Venezuelan high school at age 16, she studied architecture at Carnegie Institute of Technology (now Carnegie Mellon University) beginning in 1959. With the assistance of Alan Perlis, she shifted fields to mathematics in 1960. She married Manuel Blum, then a student at the Massachusetts Institute of Technology, and transferred in 1961 to Simmons College, a private women's liberal arts college in Boston. Simmons did not have a strong mathematics program but she was eventually able to take Isadore Singer's mathematics classes at MIT, graduating from Simmons with a B.S. in mathematics in 1963.

She received her Ph.D. in mathematics from the Massachusetts Institute of Technology in 1968. Her dissertation, Generalized Algebraic Theories: A Model Theoretic Approach, showed deep connections between model theory (a branch of mathematical logic) and differential algebra. She was supervised by Gerald Sacks (after being unable to follow an earlier advisor, Kenkichi Iwasawa, in his move to Princeton University because, at the time, Princeton did not accept female graduate students).

== Career ==
After completing her doctorate, Blum went to the University of California at Berkeley to work with Julia Robinson as a postdoctoral fellow and lecturer in mathematics. (Robinson did not have a regular position in the Berkeley Mathematics Department. It was not until 1976, when she was elected as the first woman in the mathematics section of the National Academy of Sciences, did Robinson receive a permanent offer from Berkeley.) At that time, the department had no permanent positions for women, and after two years, Blum's position as lecturer was not renewed. In 1971 she became one of the founders of the Association for Women in Mathematics.^{[AWM]} In 1973 she joined the faculty of Mills College, a women's college in the Oakland hills near Berkeley. In 1974 she founded the mathematics and computer science department at Mills, at that time the only computer science program at a women's college. She served as the head or co-head of the department for 13 years. From 1975 to 1978 she served as the third president of the Association for Women in Mathematics.^{[AWM]} Following this, Blum was elected as a Member at Large on the council of the AMS, serving from 1978 to 1980 and later as vice-President of the AMS (1990-1993). In 1979 she was awarded an endowed professorship, the first Letts-Villard Chair at Mills.

In 1983 Blum won a National Science Foundation (NSF) Visiting Professorship for Women award to work with Michael Shub for two years at the CUNY Graduate Center. In 1987 she spent a year at IBM. In 1992 Blum became the deputy director of the Mathematical Sciences Research Institute (MSRI), working there with its director William Thurston. After visiting the City University of Hong Kong in 1996–1998 to work on her book Complexity and Real Computation (during Hong Kong's handover from British to Chinese rule), she became a Distinguished Career Professor of Computer Science at Carnegie Mellon University (CMU) in 1999.

At CMU, she took the philosophy that the low numbers of women majoring in computer science were in part caused by a vicious cycle: because there were few women, the women in computer science had fewer support networks (such as friends in the same major to help them with coursework) than men. And because these factors made being a computer scientist less pleasant and more difficult for the women, fewer women chose to major in computer science. Instead of the then-popular approach of changing the curriculum to be more application-centric in the hope of attracting women, she pushed to maintain a traditional computer science program but to change the culture surrounding the program to be more welcoming. In support of this goal, she founded the Women@SCS program at CMU, which provided both mentoring and outreach opportunities for women in computer science. Through this program, which came to be directed by Blum's student Carol Frieze, CMU was able to increase the proportion of women in the undergraduate computer science program to nearly 50%.

At CMU, Blum co-directed the NSF seeded ALADDIN Center which promoted the synergy between algorithm theory and practice. She also founded Project Olympus at CMU, an business incubator program that led to many startups in Pittsburgh associated with CMU and its computer program. She resigned from CMU in 2018 (effective August 2019) after a change in management structure of the CMU Center for Innovation and Entrepreneurship, which she also co-founded, led to sexist treatment of her and the exclusion of other women from project activities.

== Research ==
The Blum Blum Shub pseudorandom number generator, published jointly by Blum, Manuel Blum, and Michael Shub, is based on the operation of squaring numbers modulo the products of two large primes. Its security can be reduced to the computational hardness assumption that integer factorization is infeasible.^{[BBS]}

Blum is also known for the Blum–Shub–Smale machine, a theoretical model of computation over the real numbers. Blum and her co-authors, Michael Shub and Stephen Smale, showed that (analogously to the theory of Turing machines) one can define analogues of NP-completeness, undecidability, and universality for this model. For instance, in this model it is undecidable to determine whether a given point belongs to the Mandelbrot set.^{[BSS]} In this model, over any field F, the problem of deciding whether or not a finite system of polynomial equations over F has a common zero is NP-complete over F. (F could be the reals or complex numbers or the integers mod 2.) Along with Felipe Cucker, Mike Shub and Steve Smale, she published a book on the subject,^{[CRC]} and in 1990 she gave an address at the International Congress of Mathematicians on computational complexity theory and real computation.. In 2012, on the eve of Alan Turing's 100th birthday she gave an invited address at the Turing Centenary Conference at the University of Cambridge on the connection between this work and little known work of Turing.

Her recent work with Manuel Blum, inspired by Turing’s simple but powerful model of computation and Bernard Baars’ theater model of consciousness, develops a simple formal machine model for consciousness from a theoretical computer science (TCS) perspective. Currently she is president of the Association for Mathematical Consciousness Science (AMCS).

== Recognition ==
In 2002, Blum was selected to be an Association for Women in Mathematics Noether Lecturer.

In 2005, Blum was a recipient of the Presidential Award for Excellence in Science, Mathematics, and Engineering Mentoring, given by president George W. Bush "for her efforts to mentor girls and women in technology fields where traditionally they are underrepresented". She was given the Simmons University 2018 Distinguished Alumnae Lifetime Achievement Award in 2018.

Blum was elected as a Fellow of the American Association for the Advancement of Science in 1979. In 2012, Blum became an inaugural fellow of the American Mathematical Society. In 2017 she was selected as an fellow of the Association for Women in Mathematics in the inaugural class.

In 2024, she was elected to the American Academy of Arts and Sciences.

Blum is included in a deck of playing cards featuring notable women mathematicians published by the Association of Women in Mathematics.

== Personal life ==
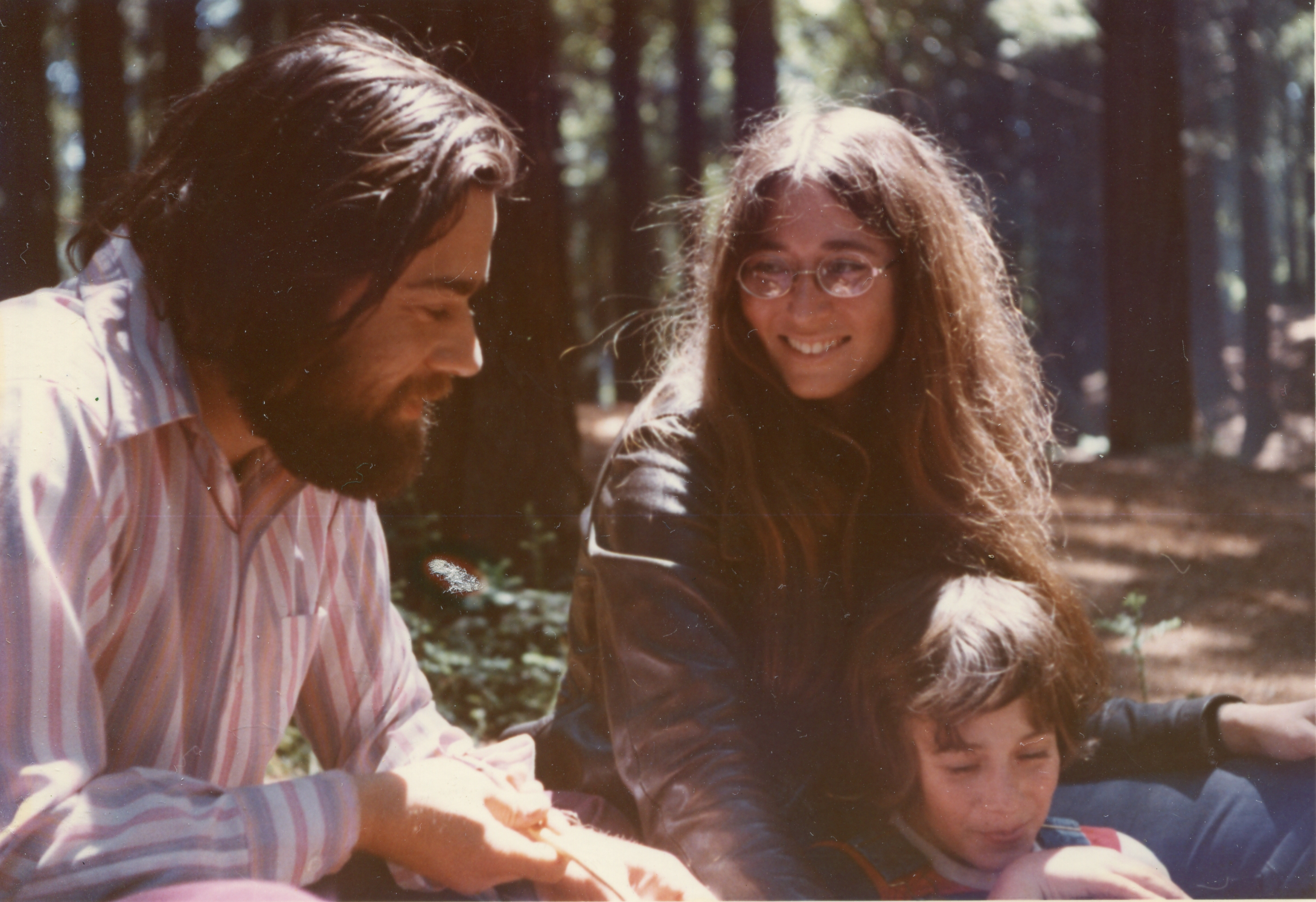
Lenore, Manuel, and Avrim Blum in 1973

Lenore Blum is married to Manuel Blum and is the mother of Avrim Blum. All three are MIT alumni and have been professors of Computer Science at Carnegie Mellon.

== Selected publications ==
MTII.	Blum, Lenore; Blum, Manuel (1975), "Toward a mathematical theory of inductive inference", Information and Computation, 28 (2): 125–155, doi:10.1016/S0019-9958(75)90261-2, MR 0395312

BBS.	Blum, L.; Blum, M.; Shub, M. (1986), "A simple unpredictable pseudorandom number generator", SIAM Journal on Computing, 15 (2): 364–383, doi:10.1137/0215025, MR 0837589

LP.	Blum, Lenore (1988), "A new simple homotopy algorithm for linear programming. I", Journal of Complexity, 4 (2): 124–136, doi:10.1016/0885-064X(88)90025-8, MR 0938440

BSS.	Blum, Lenore; Shub, Mike; Smale, Steve (1989), "On a theory of computation and complexity over the real numbers: NP-completeness, recursive functions and universal machines", Bulletin of the American Mathematical Society, New Series, 21 (1): 1–46, doi:10.1090/S0273-0979-1989-15750-9, MR 0974426

AWM.	Blum, Lenore (1991), "A brief history of the Association for Women in Mathematics: the Presidents' perspectives", Notices of the American Mathematical Society, 38 (7): 738–754, MR 1125380

CRC.	Blum, Lenore; Cucker, Felipe; Shub, Michael; Smale, Steve (1998), Complexity and Real Computation, New York: Springer-Verlag, doi:10.1007/978-1-4612-0701-6, ISBN 0-387-98281-7, S2CID 12510680
