= Algebraic Topology (book) =

2002 mathematics textbook by Allen Hatcher

- Author: Allen Hatcher
- Language: English
- Subject: Algebraic topology
- Publisher: Cambridge University Press
- Publication date: 2002
- Awards: Elias M. Stein Prize for Transformative Exposition (2025)
- ISBN: 0-521-79540-0
- Website: https://pi.math.cornell.edu/~hatcher/

Algebraic Topology is a 2002 introductory mathematics textbook on algebraic topology by Allen Hatcher. First published in 2002 by Cambridge University Press, the book is also available in a free electronic version; both print and electronic versions have been periodically revised since first publication. Aimed at the graduate level, Algebraic Topology develops the basic theory of homotopy, homology and cohomology from a classical, geometric viewpoint. The text is described as pedagogical and example-heavy, mostly favoring historical approaches laden with geometric intuition over the more modern categorical and homological viewpoint.

== Contents ==
Algebraic Topology assumes that the reader is familiar with the basics of point-set topology and abstract algebra at the undergraduate level. Category theory, homological algebra and other graduate-level algebraic machinery are introduced lightly when necessary. The book has five chapters:

- Chapter 0. Some Underlying Geometric Notions
- Chapter 1. The Fundamental Group
- Chapter 2. Homology
- Chapter 3. Cohomology
- Chapter 4. Homotopy Theory

Almost half of the volume is composed of optional chapter-end topics that explore applications and further theory.

Hatcher has also written two short, unfinished texts, Spectral Sequences and Vector Bundles and K-Theory, both graduate-level introductions to further aspects of algebraic topology.

== Reception ==
The mathematician Donald W. Kahn called Hatcher's book "one of the most interesting and accessible texts to come out in recent years" on its subject matter, having taken a "very 'student-friendly' approach (very different from the texts which always look for the greatest generality)." Another mathematician Sergei Merkulov noted Hatcher's "pure ‘back to basics’ approach" which mostly avoids categorical abstraction, praising the many examples and illustrations of the volume.

The Mathematical Association of America rated Algebraic Topology as BLL** on its Basic Library List, indicating that it "strongly recommends this book for acquisition by undergraduate mathematics libraries". In 2025, Allen Hatcher received the Elias M. Stein Prize for Transformative Exposition by the American Mathematical Society for the book's "lively mix of intuition, salient examples, and formal mathematics".

A Russian translation of Algebraic Topology was published in 2011.
