= Tau conjecture =

In mathematics, the tau conjecture may refer to one of

- Lehmer's conjecture on the non-vanishing of the Ramanujan tau function
- The Ramanujan–Petersson conjecture on the rate of growth of the Ramanujan tau function, proved by Deligne
- Shub and Smale's tau-conjecture on the integer zeroes of a polynomial, one of Smale's problems
