= Rachel Roberts =

Rachel Roberts may refer to:

- Rachel Roberts (actress) (1927–1980), Welsh actress
- Rachel Victoria Roberts, British actress sometimes credited as Rachel Roberts
- Rachel Roberts (mathematician), American mathematician
- Rachel Roberts (model) (born 1978), Canadian model and actress
- Rachel Roberts (politician) (born 1973), member of the Kentucky House of Representatives
- Rachel Roberts, author of the Avalon: Web of Magic series
- Rachel Roberts (musician), British viola-player

== See also ==
- Rachael Robertson (disambiguation)
