= General purpose analog computer =

Mathematical model of analog computers

The general purpose analog computer (GPAC) is a mathematical model of analog computers first introduced in 1941 by Claude Shannon. This model consists of circuits where several basic units are interconnected in order to compute some function. The GPAC can be implemented in practice through the use of mechanical devices or analog electronics or even digital electronics. Although analog computers have fallen almost into oblivion due to emergence of the digital computer, the GPAC has recently been studied as a way to provide evidence for the physical Church–Turing thesis. This is because the GPAC is also known to model a large class of dynamical systems defined with ordinary differential equations, which appear frequently in the context of physics. In particular it was shown in 2007 that (a deterministic variant of) the GPAC is equivalent, in computability terms, to Turing machines, thereby proving the physical Church–Turing thesis for the class of systems modelled by the GPAC. This was recently strengthened to polynomial time equivalence.

== Definition and history ==
The General Purpose Analog Computer was originally introduced by Claude Shannon. This model came as a result of his work on Vannevar Bush's differential analyzer, an early analog computer. Shannon defined the GPAC as an analog circuit consisting of five types of units: adders (which add their inputs), multipliers (which multiply their inputs), integrators, constant units (which always output the value 1), and constant multipliers (which always multiply their input by a fixed constant k). More recently, and for simplicity, the GPAC has instead been defined using the equivalent four types of units: adders, multipliers, integrators and real constant units (which always output the value k, for some fixed real number k).

In his original paper, Shannon presented a result which stated that functions computable by the GPAC are those functions which are differentially algebraic.

== See also ==
- Universal differential equation
- Blum–Shub–Smale machine
