= Allen Hatcher =

American mathematician

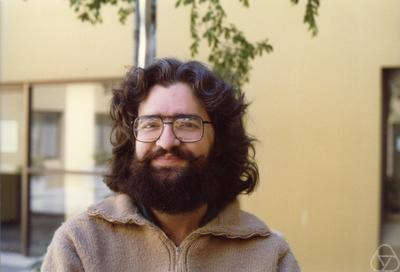
- Allen Hatcher at Berkeley in 1980
- Born: Allen Edward Hatcher; October 23, 1944 (age 81); Indianapolis, Indiana, United States
- Education: Oberlin College; Stanford University
- Scientific career
- Fields: Mathematics
- Workplaces: Princeton University; University of California, Los Angeles; Cornell University
- Thesis: A K_{2} Obstruction for Pseudo-Isotopies (1971)
- Doctoral advisor: Hans Samelson
- Doctoral students: Kiyoshi Igusa; Rachel Roberts

Allen Edward Hatcher (born October 23, 1944) is an American mathematician specializing in geometric topology.

== Biography ==
Hatcher was born in Indianapolis, Indiana. After obtaining his B.A. and B.Mus. from Oberlin College in 1966, he went for his graduate studies to Stanford University, where he received his Ph.D. in 1971. His thesis, A K_{2} Obstruction for Pseudo-Isotopies, was written under the supervision of Hans Samelson.

Afterwards, Hatcher went to Princeton University, where he was an NSF postdoc for a year, then a lecturer for another year, and then Assistant Professor from 1973 to 1979. He was also a member of the Institute for Advanced Study in 1975–76 and 1979–80. Hatcher moved to the University of California, Los Angeles as an assistant professor in 1977. From 1983 he has been a professor at Cornell University; he is now a professor emeritus.

In 1978 Hatcher was an invited speaker at the International Congress of Mathematicians in Helsinki.

In 1983 Hatcher proved the Smale conjecture, named after Stephen Smale.

== Selected publications ==
=== Papers ===
- Allen Hatcher and William Thurston, A presentation for the mapping class group of a closed orientable surface, Topology 19 (1980), no. 3, 221–237.
- Allen Hatcher, On the boundary curves of incompressible surfaces, Pacific Journal of Mathematics 99 (1982), no. 2, 373–377.
- William Floyd and Allen Hatcher, Incompressible surfaces in punctured-torus bundles, Topology and its Applications 13 (1982), no. 3, 263–282.
- Allen Hatcher and William Thurston, Incompressible surfaces in 2-bridge knot complements, Inventiones Mathematicae 79 (1985), no. 2, 225–246.
- Allen Hatcher, A proof of the Smale conjecture, $\mathrm{Diff}(S^{3})\simeq {\mathrm O}(4)$, Annals of Mathematics (2) 117 (1983), no. 3, 553–607.

=== Books ===
- Hatcher, Allen (2002). Algebraic topology. Cambridge: Cambridge University Press. ISBN 0-521-79160-X.
- Hatcher, Allen. "Vector Bundles and K-Theory".
- Hatcher, Allen. "Spectral Sequences in Algebraic Topology".
- Hatcher, Allen. "Basic Topology of 3-Manifolds".
- Hatcher, Allen. "Topology of Numbers".
