= Smale's problems =

18 mathematical problems stated in 1998

Smale's problems is a list of eighteen unsolved problems in mathematics proposed by Steve Smale in 1998 and republished in 1999. Smale composed this list in reply to a request from Vladimir Arnold, then vice-president of the International Mathematical Union, who asked several mathematicians to propose a list of problems for the 21st century. Arnold's inspiration came from the list of Hilbert's problems that had been published at the beginning of the 20th century.

In his original article Smale written that he chosen the problems using three criteria: simple statement that is preferably precise, personal acquaintance with the problem and belief that solution (or just partial results) for the problem would have great importance for development of mathematics in 21st century.

Four problems from Smale's list were later included in the list of seven Millennium Prize problems by the Clay Institute: the Riemann hypothesis, the Poincaré conjecture, the P versus NP problem, and the Navier–Stokes existence and smoothness problem.

== Table of problems ==
Problem	Brief explanation	Status	Year Solved
1st	Riemann hypothesis: The real part of every non-trivial zero of the Riemann zeta function is 1/2. (See also Hilbert's eighth problem)	Unresolved	–
2nd	Poincaré conjecture: Every simply connected, closed 3-manifold is homeomorphic to the 3-sphere.	Resolved. Result: Yes, follows from Thurston's geometrization conjecture proved by Grigori Perelman using Ricci flow.	2003
3rd	P versus NP problem: For all problems for which an algorithm can verify a given solution in polynomial time, can an algorithm also find that solution in polynomial time?	Unresolved	–
4th	Shub–Smale tau-conjecture: let $f\in \mathbb{Z}[x]$ and by $\tau(f)$ denote the minimal number of steps required to generate $f$ using addition, subtraction or multiplication from $1$ and $x$. Is there a constant $c$ independent on $f$ such that number of integer zeros of $f$ is bounded by $\tau(f)^c$?	Unresolved	–
5th	Can one decide if a Diophantine equation f(x, y) = 0 (input f ∈ $\mathbb{Z}$ [u, v]) has an integer solution, (x, y), in time (2^{s})^{c} for some universal constant c? That is, can the problem be decided in exponential time?	Unresolved	–
6th	Is the number of relative equilibria (central configurations) finite in the n-body problem of celestial mechanics, for any choice of positive real numbers m_{1}, ..., m_{n} as the masses?	Unresolved. Partial results include proof for almost all systems of five bodies by A. Albouy and V. Kaloshin.	–
7th	Algorithm for finding set of $(x_1,...,x_N)$ such that the function: $V_N(x) = \sum_{1 \leq i < j \leq N} \log \frac{1}{\|x_i - x_j\|}$ is minimized for a distribution of N points on a 2-sphere. This is related to the Thomson problem.	Unresolved	–
8th	Develop dynamical mathematical model of market equilibrium to include price adjustments. The excess demand function in such model is required to satisfy economic-justified conditions: be independent on equal inflation of all prices; satisfy Walras's law; return positive demand on free goods; The model may incorporate other economic variables along with the prices but it should be compatible with existing general equilibrium theory.	Gjerstad (2013) extends the deterministic model of price adjustment by Hahn and Negishi (1962) to a stochastic model and shows that when the stochastic model is linearized around the equilibrium the result is the autoregressive price adjustment model used in applied econometrics. He then tests the model with price adjustment data from a general equilibrium experiment. The model performs well in a general equilibrium experiment with two commodities. Lindgren (2022) provides a dynamic programming model for general equilibrium with price adjustments, where price dynamics are given by a Hamilton-Jacobi-Bellman partial differerential equation. Good Lyapunov stability conditions are provided as well.	2013, 2022?
9th	The linear programming problem: Find a strongly-polynomial time algorithm which for given matrix A ∈ R^{m×n} and b ∈ R^{m} decides whether there exists x ∈ R^{n} with Ax ≥ b.	Unresolved	–
10th	Pugh's closing lemma (higher order of smoothness)	Unresolved. Partial results include proof for Hamiltonian diffeomorphisms of closed surfaces by M. Asaoka and K. Irie.	–
11th	Is one-dimensional dynamics generally hyperbolic? (a) Can a complex polynomial T be approximated by one of the same degree with the property that every critical point tends to a periodic sink under iteration? (b) Can a smooth map T : [0,1] → [0,1] be C^{r} approximated by one which is hyperbolic, for all r > 1?	(a) Unresolved, even in the simplest parameter space of polynomials, like the Mandelbrot set.	–
11th	Is one-dimensional dynamics generally hyperbolic? (a) Can a complex polynomial T be approximated by one of the same degree with the property that every critical point tends to a periodic sink under iteration? (b) Can a smooth map T : [0,1] → [0,1] be C^{r} approximated by one which is hyperbolic, for all r > 1?	(b) Resolved. Proved by Kozlovski, Shen and van Strien.	2007
12th	For a closed manifold $M$ and any $r \geq 1$ let $\mathrm{Diff}^r(M)$ be the topological group of $C^r$ diffeomorphisms of $M$ onto itself. Given arbitrary $A \in \mathrm{Diff}^r(M)$, is it possible to approximate it arbitrary well by such $T \in \mathrm{Diff}^r(M)$ that it commutes only with its iterates? In other words, is the subset of all diffeomorphisms whose centralizers are trivial dense in $\mathrm{Diff}^r(M)$?	Unresolved. Partial results include proof for C^{1} topology by Christian Bonatti, Sylvain Crovisier and Amie Wilkinson. Still open in the C^{r} topology for r > 1.	–
13th	Having a polynomial vector field on a real plane defined by polynomials: $$v(x,y)=[P(x,y),Q(x,y)]^\text{T}$$ is the number of limit cycles in that field limited by a bound $K$: $$K \leq \max \lbrace \deg P, \deg Q\rbrace^{q}$$ where constant $q$ is independent on the choice of polynomials? (See also: Hilbert's sixteenth problem)	Unresolved	–
14th	Do the properties of the Lorenz attractor exhibit that of a strange attractor?	Resolved. Result: Yes, solved by Warwick Tucker using a computer-assisted proof combined with normal form techniques.	2002
15th	Do the Navier–Stokes equations for incompressible flow and constant but non-zero viscosity and no external force applied to the flow in $\mathbb{R}^3$ always have a unique smooth solution that extends for all time?	Unresolved. Results about breakdown of solutions in finite time proposed in 2026 requires external force applied to the flow, that is irrelevant for original Smale problem.	–
16th	Jacobian conjecture: If F : k^{N} → k^{N} is regular mapping and the Jacobian determinant of F is a non-zero constant and k has characteristic 0, then F has an inverse function G : k^{N} → k^{N} that is also regular.	For $N = 3$, a counterexample was given by Levent Alpöge, who claimed using a large language model assistance. This counterexample induces counterexamples for $N \geq 4$. It is unsure if this problem should be thought as resolved completely, since the case $N = 2$ remains open, with specialist literature distinguishing its status from the case $N\ge 3$.	2026?
17th	Solving polynomial equations in polynomial time in the average case	Resolved. C. Beltrán and L. M. Pardo found two uniform probabilistic algorithms (average Las Vegas algorithm) for this problem F. Cucker and P. Bürgisser made the smoothed analysis of a probabilistic algorithm à la Beltrán-Pardo and then exhibited a deterministic algorithm running in time $N^{O(\log\log N)}$. Finally, P. Lairez found an alternative method to de-randomize the algorithm à la Beltrán-Pardo and thus found a deterministic algorithm which runs in average polynomial time. All these works follow Shub and Smale's foundational work (the "Bezout series") started in	2008–2016
18th	Limits of intelligence (it talks about the fundamental problems of intelligence and learning, both from the human and machine side)	Recent results include claims about the unlimited nature of human intelligence and limitations on neural-network-based artificial intelligence. There is no consensus whether problem is resolved.	–

In later versions, Smale also listed three additional problems, "that don't seem important enough to merit a place on our main list, but it would still be nice to solve them":

1. Mean value problem
2. Is the three-sphere a minimal set (Gottschalk's conjecture)?
3. Is an Anosov diffeomorphism of a compact manifold topologically the same as the Lie group model of John Franks?

== See also ==
- Millennium Prize Problems
- Simon problems
- Taniyama's problems
- Hilbert's problems
- Thurston's 24 questions
