= Smale conjecture =

Theorem that the diffeomorphism group of the 3-sphere has the homotopy-type of O(4)

The Smale conjecture, named after Stephen Smale, is the statement that the diffeomorphism group of the 3-sphere has the homotopy-type of its isometry group, the orthogonal group O(4). It was proved in 1983 by Allen Hatcher.

== Equivalent statements ==
There are several equivalent statements of the Smale conjecture. One is that the component of the unknot in the space of smooth embeddings of the circle in 3-space has the homotopy-type of the round circles, equivalently, O(3). Interestingly, this statement is not equivalent to the generalized Smale Conjecture, in higher dimensions.

Another equivalent statement is that the group of diffeomorphisms of the 3-ball which restrict to the identity on the boundary is contractible.

Yet another equivalent statement is that the space of constant-curvature Riemann metrics on the 3-sphere is contractible.

== Higher dimensions ==
The (false) statement that the inclusion $O(n+1) \to \text{Diff}(S^n)$ is a weak equivalence for all $n$ is sometimes meant when referring to the generalized Smale conjecture. For $n = 1$, this is classical, for $n = 2$, Smale proved it himself.

For $n\ge5$ the conjecture is false due to the failure of $\text{Diff}(S^n)/O(n+1)$ to be contractible.

In late 2018, Tadayuki Watanabe released a preprint that proves the failure of Smale's conjecture in the remaining 4-dimensional case relying on work around the Kontsevich integral, a generalization of the Gauss linking integral. As of 2021, the proof remains unpublished in a mathematical journal.

== See also ==
- Sphere bundle
