= Rachael Robertson =

Rachel or Rachael Robertson may refer to:

- Rachael Robertson (television presenter), Scottish announcer with Grampian and BBC since 1990s
- Rachael Robertson (writer) (born 1969), Australian expedition leader in Antarctica and speaker
- Rachel Robertson (field hockey) (born 1976), New Zealand Olympian in 2004
- Rachel Robertson (born 2007), Scottish racing driver who competes in F1 Academy

== See also ==
- Rachel Roberts (disambiguation)
