= Carol Frieze =

American computer scientist

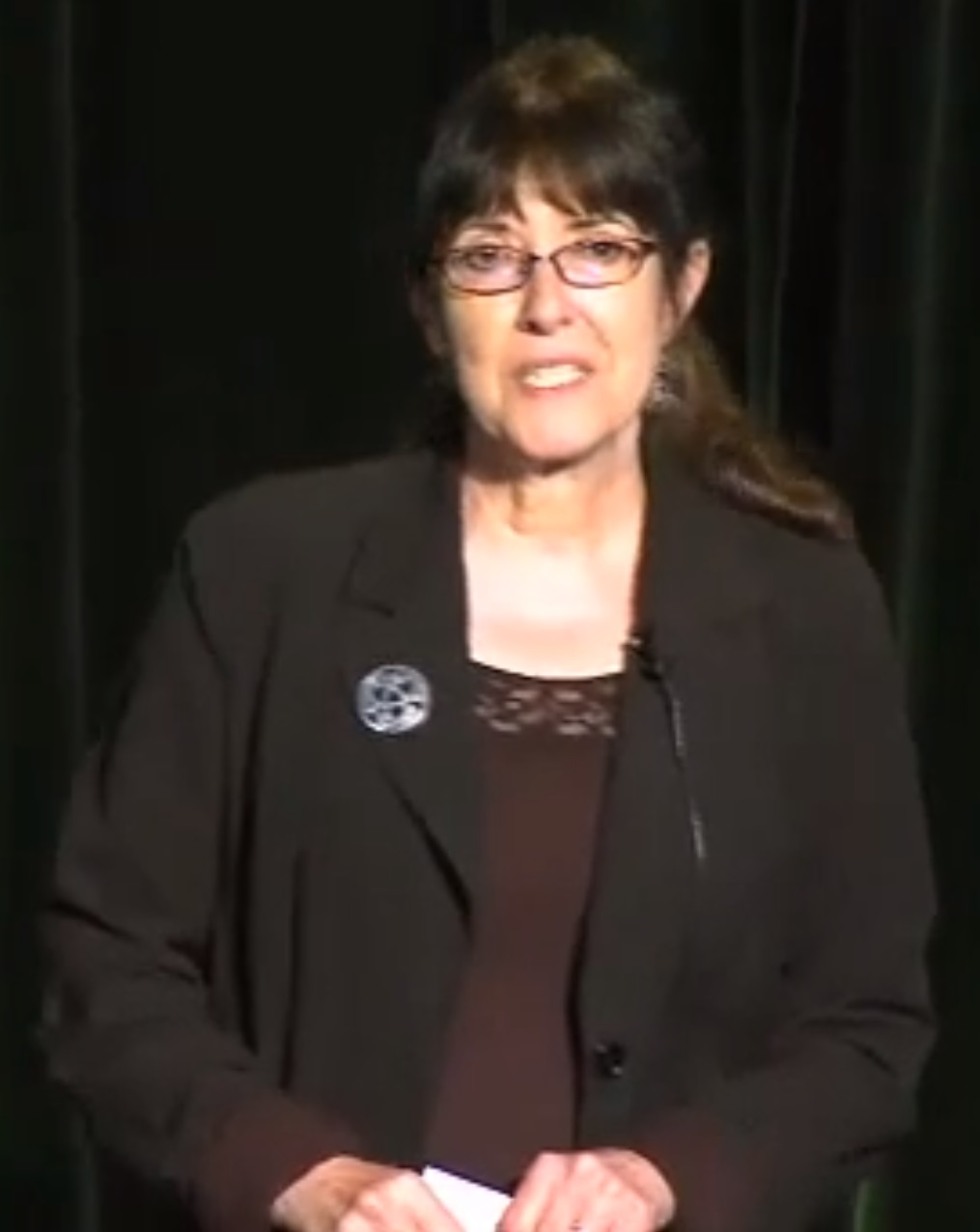
Frieze speaks at the National Center for Women & Information Technology Summit Workshop 2012

Carol Frieze works in the School of Computer Science at Carnegie Mellon University as director of the Women@SCS and SCS4ALL professional organizations. She is co-author of a book on the successful efforts to attract and retain women in computing at Carnegie Mellon, where women represented 50% of the incoming class to the computer science major in fall 2018. She has been recognized by the A. Nico Habermann Award of the Computing Research Association and the AccessComputing Capacity Building Award.

== Education and career ==
Frieze studied English literature for a while at the University of London before moving into cultural studies at Carnegie Mellon, eventually earning her Ph.D. from Carnegie Mellon University in Cultural Studies in Computer Science. Her 2007 dissertation, The critical role of culture and environment as determinants of women's participation in computer science, was supervised by Lenore Blum. She has taught at the Royal National Orthopaedic Hospital School in England and in the English department at Carnegie Mellon before coming to work for the School of Computer Science.

Women@SCS, one of the organizations Frieze directs at Carnegie Mellon, is based on the guiding premise of leveling the playing field, working to ensure that women receive the same social, networking, mentoring, and professional opportunities, that are more readily available to the majority male peers. She also works on diversity and inclusion through BiasBusters@CMU, an academic interactive program aiming to raise awareness of bias and mitigate the harmful effects of unconscious bias on campus.

== Books ==
With Jeria Quesenberry, Frieze is a co-author of the book Kicking Butt in Computer Science: Women in Computing at Carnegie Mellon University (Dog Ear Publishing, 2015). The book describes Carnegie Mellon's successful work to attract and retain female students in Carnegie Mellon's computer science major by focusing on the culture of computing rather than by making changes to the computer science curriculum.

== Recognition ==
Frieze won the A. Nico Habermann Award of the Computing Research Association in 2017. The award citation commended her for "devoting nearly two decades to promoting diversity and inclusiveness in computing", for publishing "valuable research towards understanding the challenges diverse populations face", and for helping to bring the number of women majoring in computer science at Carnegie Mellon close to 50%, "far above the national average".

== Personal life ==
Frieze grew up in a coal mining village in Nottinghamshire, England, and was the first in her family to go to college. Frieze is married to mathematician Alan M. Frieze. They have two adult children and four grandchildren.
