= Rachel Roberts (mathematician) =

American mathematician

Rachel Roberts is an American mathematician specializing in low-dimensional topology, including foliations and contact geometry. She is the Elinor Anheuser Professor of Mathematics at Washington University in St. Louis.

Roberts completed her Ph.D. at Cornell University in 1992. Her dissertation, supervised by Allen Hatcher, was Constructing Taut Foliations. She was elected to the 2026 class of Fellows of the American Mathematical Society.

== Publications ==
- Delman, Charles; Roberts, Rachel (1999). "Alternating knots satisfy strong property P". Commentarii Mathematici Helvetici. 74 (3): 376–397. doi:10.1007/s000140050095. MR 1710698.
- Roberts, Rachel; Shareshian, John; Stein, Melanie (2003). "Infinitely many hyperbolic 3-manifolds which contain no Reebless foliation". Journal of the American Mathematical Society. 16 (3): 639–680. doi:10.1090/s0894-0347-03-00426-0. MR 1969207.
