= Rosemary Renaut =

British and American computational mathematician

- Born: Rosemary Anne Renaut
- Education: Durham University (BA); University of Cambridge (PhD)
- Known for: Inverse problems Regularization; Medical imaging
- Awards: SIAM Fellow (2022)
- Scientific career
- Fields: Computational mathematics
- Workplaces: Arizona State University; National Science Foundation
- Doctoral advisor: Arieh Iserles

Rosemary Anne Renaut is a British and American computational mathematician whose research interests include inverse problems and regularization with applications to medical imaging and seismic analysis. She is a professor in the School of Mathematical and Statistical Sciences at Arizona State University.

== Education and career ==
Renaut earned a bachelor's degree in 1980 at Durham University and then studied for Part III of the Mathematical Tripos in applied mathematics at the University of Cambridge. She completed her Ph.D. at Cambridge in 1985. Her dissertation, Numerical Solution of Hyperbolic Partial Differential Equations, was supervised by Arieh Iserles.

After postdoctoral research at RWTH Aachen University in Germany and the Chr. Michelsen Institute in Norway, she joined the Arizona State University faculty as an assistant professor in 1987. She was promoted to associate professor in 1991 and full professor in 1996, and chaired the Department of Mathematics from 1997 to 2001.

She has also visited multiple other institutions, including a term as John von Neumann Professor at the Technical University of Munich in 2001–2002, and terms as program director for computational mathematics and mathematical biology at the National Science Foundation from 2008 to 2011 and 2014 to 2017.

== Recognition ==
Renaut has been a Fellow of the Institute of Mathematics and its Applications since 1996. She was elected as a Fellow of the Society for Industrial and Applied Mathematics, in the 2022 Class of SIAM Fellows, "for contributions to ill-posed inverse problems and regularization, geophysical and medical imaging, and high order numerical methods".
