= Sphere bundle =

In the mathematical field of topology, a sphere bundle is a fiber bundle in which the fibers are spheres $S^n$ of some dimension n. Similarly, in a disk bundle, the fibers are disks $D^n$. From a topological perspective, there is no difference between sphere bundles and disk bundles: this is a consequence of the Alexander trick, which implies $\operatorname{BTop}(D^{n+1}) \simeq \operatorname{BTop}(S^n).$

An example of a sphere bundle is the torus, which is orientable and has $S^1$ fibers over an $S^1$ base space. The non-orientable Klein bottle also has $S^1$ fibers over an $S^1$ base space, but has a twist that produces a reversal of orientation as one follows the loop around the base space.

A circle bundle is a special case of a sphere bundle.

== Orientation of a sphere bundle ==
A sphere bundle that is a product space is orientable, as is any sphere bundle over a simply connected space.

If E be a real vector bundle on a space X and if E is given an orientation, then a sphere bundle formed from E, Sph(E), inherits the orientation of E.

== Spherical fibration ==
A spherical fibration, a generalization of the concept of a sphere bundle, is a fibration whose fibers are homotopy equivalent to spheres. For example, the fibration

$$\operatorname{BTop}(\mathbb{R}^n) \to \operatorname{BTop}(S^n)$$

has fibers homotopy equivalent to S^{n}.

== See also ==
- Smale conjecture
