= Ronald DeVore =

American mathematician

Ronald A. DeVore
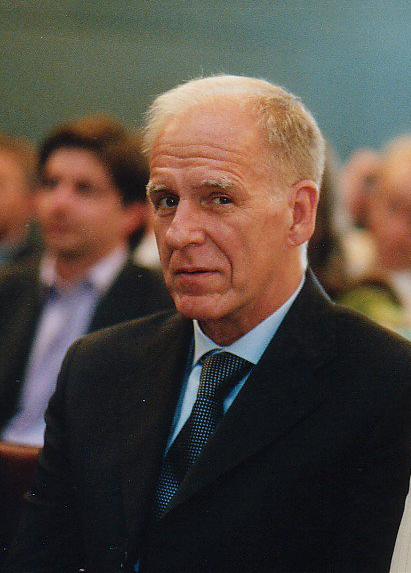
- Born: May 14, 1941 (age 85); Detroit, Michigan, US
- Education: Ohio State University; Eastern Michigan University
- Known for: Approximation theory, Wavelet theory, Compressive sensing
- Awards: Member of Bulgarian Academy of Sciences (2007) SPIE Wavelet Pioneer Award (2007); Plenary Lecturer, International Congress of Mathematicians (2006); Honorary Doctorate, RWTH Aachen University (2004); Humboldt Prize (2002); Member of American Academy of Arts and Sciences (2001); Bulgarian Gold Medal of Science (2001) Journal of Complexity Outstanding Paper Award (2000)
- Scientific career
- Fields: Mathematician
- Workplaces: Texas A&M University
- Doctoral advisor: Ranko Bojanic

Ronald Alvin DeVore (born May 14, 1941) is an American mathematician and academic. He is the Walter E. Koss Professor and a Distinguished Professor of Mathematics at Texas A&M University. DeVore is a member of the American Academy of Arts and Sciences and the National Academy of Sciences and a fellow of the American Mathematical Society.

== Academic biography ==
DeVore received a B.S. from Eastern Michigan University in 1964 and a Ph.D. in mathematics from Ohio State University in 1967 under the supervision of Ranko Bojanic. From 1968 to 1977 he was at Oakland University. In 1977 he became a professor at the University of South Carolina, where he served as the Robert L. Sumwalt Professor of Mathematics from 1986 to 2005. From 1999 to 2005 he also served as the director of the Industrial Mathematics Institutes, which he founded. In 2005 he retired from the University of South Carolina. Since 2008 he has been the Walter E. Koss Professor at Texas A&M University and was named Distinguished Professor in Fall 2010.

DeVore has been a visiting professor at a number of universities around the world, including: Ohio State University (1967–1968), the University of Alberta (1971–1972), University of Erlangen–Nuremberg (1975–1976), University of Bonn (1977, 1978, 1979), Texas A&M University (1983), Scuola Normale di Pisa (1984), the University of Wisconsin (1983–1984, 1985, 1991), Purdue University (1990), the University of Paris VI (1996, 2000, 2002, 2004, 2005), Princeton University (1997–1998), RWTH Aachen University (2002), the University of Maryland (2004–2005), Rice University (2005–2006), the Courant Institute at New York University (2006–2007), and the Fondation Sciences Mathématiques de Paris (2009–2010).

== Research ==
DeVore has been active in the development of many areas of applied mathematics such as numerical analysis of partial differential equations, machine learning algorithms, approximation of functions, wavelet transforms, and statistics. He has also made significant contributions to the theory of compressive sensing.

== Awards and honors ==
DeVore has received numerous awards, including an Alexander von Humboldt Fellowship from 1975 to 1976, the Journal of Complexity Outstanding Paper Award in 2000, the Bulgarian Gold Medal of Science in 2001, the Humboldt Prize in 2002, the ICS Hot Paper Award in 2003, an honorary doctorate from RWTH Aachen University in 2004, and the SPIE Wavelet Pioneer Award in 2007. He was also a plenary lecturer at the International Congress of Mathematicians in 2006.

In 2001 he became a member of the American Academy of Arts and Sciences, and in 2007 he became a member of the Bulgarian Academy of Sciences. In 2012 he became a fellow of the American Mathematical Society. From 2000 to 2002 he was the Chair of the Society for the Foundations of Computational Mathematics In 2017 he was elected to the National Academy of Sciences. He was named a SIAM Fellow in 2018.

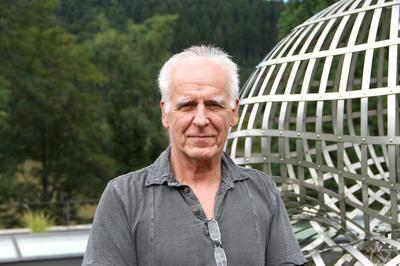
Ronald A. DeVore
