= Foundations of Computational Mathematics =

- Formation: 1995
- Chair: Wolfgang Dahmen
- Website: http://focm-society.org/

Foundations of Computational Mathematics (FoCM) is an international nonprofit organization that supports and promotes research at the interface of mathematics and computation. It fosters interaction among mathematics, computer science, and other areas of computational science through conferences, events and publications.

== Aim ==
FoCM aims to explore the relationship between mathematics and computation, focusing both on the search for mathematical solutions to computational problems and computational solutions to mathematical problems. Topics of central interest in the Society include but are not restricted to:

- Approximation Theory
- Computational Algebraic Geometry
- Computational Dynamics
- Computational Harmonic Analysis, Image, and Signal Processing
- Computational Number Theory
- Computational Topology and Geometry
- Continuous Optimization
- Foundations of Numerical PDE's
- Geometric Integration and Computational Mechanics
- Graph Theory and Combinatorics
- Information-based Complexity
- Learning Theory
- Multiresolution and Adaptivity in Numerical PDE's
- Numerical Linear Algebra
- Random Matrices
- Real-Number Complexity
- Special Functions and Orthogonal Polynomials
- Stochastic Computing
- Symbolic Analysis

== History ==
The Society for the Foundations of Computational Mathematics was launched in the Northern summer of 1995, following a month-long AMS–SIAM Summer Seminar in Park City, Utah, which was organized principally by Stephen Smale. That meeting hosted a number of sub-conferences on the frontier of Mathematics and Computation, focusing on many topics from numerical analysis and on the importance of a foundational theory of real number computation. The main thrust was on creating a shared intellectual space for activity bringing together computation and mathematics. During the final week at Michael Shub's behest an informal lunch was arranged where Felipe Cucker, Arieh Iserles, Narendra Karmarkar, James Renegar, Michael Shub and Stephen Smale decided to go ahead and create a permanent entity that would organize periodic conferences covering subjects in the interplay between these two areas. After a discussion, the name Foundations of Computational Mathematics was settled, and Michael Shub was chosen to lead the initiative with a little team formed by himself, Arieh Iserles and James Renegar.

The first FoCM conference took place in Rio de Janeiro and was hosted by IMPA with the support of its then-director Jacob Palis. Several conferences were organized later (see below), bringing together some of the world leading mathematicians and computer scientists, although the society was not formally established as a legal entity until 1999 simultaneously with the creation of the journal Foundations of Computational Mathematics. Ever since, its main activities are its triennial meetings, special semesters and the support of the FoCM journal, as well as general advocacy of the mathematical areas underlying computation.

== Meetings ==
The main FoCM conference is held every three years. Previous meetings include:

- Park City AMS—SIAM 1995 Summer Seminar (Utah, USA), considered as the founding event of the society. Announcement. Panel discussion.
- FoCM'97 (Rio de Janeiro, Brazil). International organizing committee. Local organizing committee.
- FoCM'99 (Oxford, United Kingdom). Organizing committee Plenary speakers. List of Workshops.
- FoCM 2002 (Minneapolis, USA).
- FoCM 2005 (Santander, Spain).
- FoCM 2008 (Hong Kong, China).
- FoCM 2011 (Budapest, Hungary).
- FoCM 2014 (Montevideo, Uruguay).

These conferences aim to cover the entire spectrum of mathematical computation. In addition to that, specialized events focusing on particular research topics are organized by the society, including:

- Foundations of Computational Mathematics Half Year Program, Berkeley, 1998, Mathematical Sciences Research Institute. Organizing committee.
- Special Semester on Foundations of Computational Mathematics, Hong Kong, 1999, City University of Hong Kong.
- Thematic Program on the Foundations of Computational Mathematics, Toronto, 2009, Fields Institute.
- From Dynamics to Complexity A conference celebrating the work of Mike Shub, Toronto, 2012 Fields Institute.

== Publications ==
Since January 2001, FoCM supports the journal Foundations of Computational Mathematics. Editors in Chief of the journal:

- Michael Shub (2001–2002).
- Peter Olver (2002–2008).
- Arieh Iserles (2002–2011).
- Michael Todd (2008–2011).
- Felipe Cucker (2011–2017).
- Albert Cohen (2014–2020).
- Hans Munthe-Kaas (2017–present).
- Teresa Krick (2020–present).

== Chairs ==
The Chair of FoCM is elected every 3 years. This position has been held by various mathematicians worldwide.

- Michael Shub (1995–1997).
- Arieh Iserles (1997–2000).
- Ronald DeVore (2000–2002).
- Endre Süli (2002–2005).
- Michael Todd (2005–2008).
- Felipe Cucker (2008–2011).
- Teresa Krick (2011–2014).
- Wolfgang Dahmen (2014–2017).
- Agnes Szanto (2017–2020).
- Albert Cohen (2020–present).

== Stephen Smale Prize ==
FoCM awards the Stephen Smale Prize, whose objective is to recognize the work of a young mathematician in the areas at the heart of the society's interests and to help to promote his or her integration among the leaders of the scientific community. Smale Prize recipients:

- Snorre H. Christiansen (2011). Laudatio.
- Carlos Beltrán and Mark Bravermann (2014). Laudatio.
- Lek-Heng Lim (2017).
- Afonso Bandeira (2020).
