= Arieh Iserles =

British mathematician (born 1947)

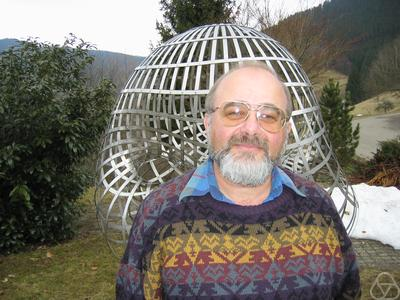
- Iserles at Oberwolfach in 2006
- Born: 2 September 1947 (age 79)
- Education: Hebrew University of Jerusalem, Ben-Gurion University of the Negev
- Scientific career
- Workplaces: University of Cambridge
- Doctoral advisor: Giacomo Della Riccia
- Doctoral students: Rosemary Renaut

Arieh Iserles (born 2 September 1947) is a computational mathematician, currently Professor of the Numerical Analysis of Differential Equations at the University of Cambridge and a member of the Department of Applied Mathematics and Theoretical Physics.

He studied at the Hebrew University of Jerusalem and Ben-Gurion University of the Negev and wrote his PhD dissertation on numerical methods for stiff ordinary differential equations. His research comprises many themes in computational and applied mathematics: ordinary and partial differential equations, approximation theory, geometric numerical integration, orthogonal polynomials, functional equations, computational dynamics and the computation of highly oscillatory phenomena.

He has written a textbook, A First Course in the Numerical Analysis of Differential Equations (Cambridge University Press, 2nd ed. 2009).

Iserles is the managing editor of Acta Numerica, editor-in-chief of IMA Journal of Numerical Analysis and an editor of several other mathematical journals. From 1997 to 2000 he was the chair of the Society for the Foundations of Computational Mathematics.

From 2010 to 2015 he was a director of the Cambridge Centre for Analysis (CCA), an EPSRC-funded Centre for Doctoral Training in mathematical analysis.

In 1999, he was awarded the Onsager Medal by the Norwegian University of Science and Technology. In 2012 he received the David Crighton Medal, presented by the Institute of Mathematics and its Applications and London Mathematical Society "for services to mathematics and the mathematics community" and in 2014 he was awarded by the Society for Industrial and Applied Mathematics the SIAM Prize for Distinguished Service to the Profession. In 2012, Iserles was an invited speaker at the 6th European Congress of Mathematics in Kraków.
