= Hilbert's eighth problem =

On the distribution of prime numbers

Hilbert's eighth problem is one of David Hilbert's list of open mathematical problems posed in 1900. It concerns various branches of number theory, and is actually a set of three different problems:

- the original Riemann hypothesis for the Riemann zeta function
- the solvability of two-variable, linear, diophantine equations in prime numbers (where the twin prime conjecture and Goldbach conjecture are special cases of this equation)
- the generalization of methods using the Riemann zeta function to estimate distribution of primes in integers to Dedekind zeta functions, and to use them for distribution of prime ideals in a ring of integers of arbitrary number fields.

Along with Hilbert's sixteenth problem, it became one of the hardest problems on the list, with very few particular results towards its solution. After a century, the Riemann hypothesis was listed as one of Smale's problems and the Millennium Prize Problems. The twin prime conjecture and Goldbach conjecture, being special cases of linear diophantine equations, became two of four Landau problems.

== Original statement ==
=== Riemann hypothesis ===
Essential progress in the theory of the distribution of prime numbers has lately been made by Hadamard, de la Vallée-Poussin, Von Mangoldt and others. For the complete solution, however, of the problems set us by Riemann's paper "Ueber die Anzahl der Primzahlen unter einer gegebenen Grösse," it still remains to prove the correctness of an exceedingly important statement of Riemann, viz., that the zero points of the function zeta(s) defined by the series:

$$\zeta(s)=1+\frac{1}{2^s}+\frac{1}{3^s}+\frac{1}{4^s}+\dots$$

All have the real part 1/2, except the well-known negative integral real zeros. As soon as this proof has been successfully established, the next problem would consist in testing more exactly Riemann's infinite series for the number of primes below a given number and, especially, to decide whether the difference between the number of primes below a number x and the integral logarithm of x does in fact become infinite of an order not greater than 1/2 in x. Further, we should determine whether the occasional condensation of prime numbers which has been noticed in counting primes is really due to those terms of Riemann's formula which depend upon the first complex zeros of the function $\zeta(s)$.

=== Linear diophantine equation ===
After an exhaustive discussion of Riemann's prime number formula, perhaps we may sometime be in a position to attempt the rigorous solution of Goldbach's problem, viz., whether every integer is expressible as the sum of two positive prime numbers; and further to attack the well-known question, whether there are an infinite number of pairs of prime numbers with the difference 2, or even the more general problem, whether the linear diophantine equation:

$$ax + by + c = 0$$

(with given integral coefficients each prime to the others) is always solvable in prime numbers x and y.

=== Dedekind zeta functions ===
But the following problem seems to me of no less interest and perhaps of still wider range: To apply the results obtained for the distribution of rational prime numbers to the theory of the distribution of ideal primes in a given number-field $K$ - a problem which looks toward the study of the function $\zeta_K(s)$ belonging to the field and defined by the series:

$$\zeta_K(s)=\sum \frac{1}{n(j)^s}$$

where the sum extends over all ideals j of the given realm K, and n(j) denotes the norm of the ideal j.

== Progress towards solution ==
=== Riemann Hypothesis ===
In a century after the statement of the problem by Hilbert, only much weaker density estimations that follows trivially from Riemann Hypothesis was proved:

- Hardy & Littlewood (1921) proved that infinitely many of non-trivial zeros satisfy Riemann Hypothesis. This result was improved many times: Selberg (1942) showed that some positive proportion of zeros satisfy it, Levinson (1974) improved this estimation to 1/3, Conrey (1989) to 2/5, best result is due to Pratt et al. (2020) who achieved estimation 5/12.
- Bohr & Landau (1914) showed that for arbitrary small $\epsilon > 0$ and imaginary part $-T<\operatorname{Im}(z)<T$ number of zeros with real part in $|\operatorname{Re}(z)-\tfrac{1}{2}|\leq \epsilon$ is $O(T)$. Combining this with fact that number of zeros with such imaginary part is $O(T\log T)$ and taking T tending to infinity, it gives that almost all of zeros lie arbitrary close to critical line.

In a century after appearance on Hilbert's list many equivalents were proposed, such as Li criterion, vanishing of de Bruijn-Newman constant or growth rate of arithmetic functions. Original Riemann Hypothesis get many generaliztions to wider classes of functions, which allowed to relate it to automorphic forms and Langlands program. Despite it is no solution for the problem and Langlands program itself is still highly conjectural, it opens more way for attempts in the future.

=== Diophantine equation ===
The general case of diophantine equations given by Hilbert seems to be unable to attack using present tools in number theory.

Results about lower bounds of gaps between primes obtained by Yitang Zhang and later improved by Polymath project provides partial result for very special case:

$$x-y+c=0$$

Lower bound for prime gaps says that there exists some $c\leq 246$ such that this equation has an infinite number of solutions in primes. Twin prime conjecture is equivalent to $c=2$ being such number, but from more general Dickson conjecture follows that every even number should be such number.

Some much weaker results following from twin prime conjecture and Goldbach conjecture, like Chen's theorem or the attempted proof of Goldbach's weak conjecture by Harald Helfgott (currently under review), gives reason to believe in truth of original conjectures, but don't provide answers about prime solutions of equation given by Hilbert.

=== Dedekind zeta functions ===
For Dedekind zeta functions, the status of the problem depends what kind of results one expects from Dedekind zeta functions.

Existence of analytic continuation for them was proven by Erich Hecke along with functional equation. This allowed to obtain similar results for prime ideals in rings of integers as for usual primes with current knowledge about Riemann zeta function. However, if one interpret this in context of the first point of the problem as a challenge to prove extended Riemann hypothesis, and thus obtain the much stronger results following from it, this part of the problem is still unresolved.
