= Universal differential equation =

A universal differential equation (UDE) is a non-trivial differential algebraic equation with the property that its solutions can approximate any continuous function on any interval of the real line to any desired level of accuracy.

Precisely, a (possibly implicit) differential equation $P(y', y'', y''', ..., y^{(n)}) = 0$ is a UDE if for any continuous real-valued function $f$ and for any positive continuous function $\varepsilon$ there exist a smooth solution $y$ of $P(y', y'', y''', ..., y^{(n)}) = 0$ with $|y(x) - f(x)| < \varepsilon (x)$ for all $x \in \R$.

The existence of an UDE has been initially regarded as an analogue of the universal Turing machine for analog computers, because of a result of Shannon that identifies the outputs of the general purpose analog computer with the solutions of algebraic differential equations. However, in contrast to universal Turing machines, UDEs do not dictate the evolution of a system, but rather sets out certain conditions that any evolution must fulfill.

== Examples ==
- Rubel found the first known UDE in 1981. It is given by the following implicit differential equation of fourth-order: $3 y^{\prime 4} y^{\prime \prime} y^{\prime \prime \prime \prime 2}-4 y^{\prime 4} y^{\prime \prime \prime 2} y^{\prime \prime \prime \prime}+6 y^{\prime 3} y^{\prime \prime 2} y^{\prime \prime \prime} y^{\prime \prime \prime \prime}+24 y^{\prime 2} y^{\prime \prime 4} y^{\prime \prime \prime \prime}-12 y^{\prime 3} y^{\prime \prime} y^{\prime \prime \prime 3}-29 y^{\prime 2} y^{\prime \prime 3} y^{\prime \prime \prime 2}+12 y^{\prime \prime 7}=0$
- Duffin obtained a family of UDEs given by:

$n^2 y^{\prime \prime \prime \prime} y^{\prime 2}+3 n(1-n) y^{\prime \prime \prime} y^{\prime \prime} y^{\prime}+\left(2 n^2-3 n+1\right) y^{\prime \prime 3}=0$ and $n y^{\prime \prime \prime \prime} y^{\prime 2}+(2-3 n) y^{\prime \prime \prime} y^{\prime \prime} y^{\prime}+2(n-1) y^{\prime \prime 3}=0$, whose solutions are of class $C^n$ for n > 3.

- Briggs proposed another family of UDEs whose construction is based on Jacobi elliptic functions:

$y^{\prime \prime \prime \prime} y^{\prime 2}-3 y^{\prime \prime \prime \prime} y^{\prime \prime} y^{\prime}+2\left(1-n^{-2}\right) y^{\prime \prime 3}=0$, where n > 3.

- Bournez and Pouly proved the existence of a fixed polynomial vector field p such that for any f and ε there exists some initial condition of the differential equation y' = p(y) that yields a unique and analytic solution satisfying |y(x) − f(x)| < ε(x) for all x in R.

== See also ==
- Zeta function universality
- Hölder's theorem
