= Blum Blum Shub =

Pseudorandom number generator

Blum Blum Shub (B.B.S.) is a pseudorandom number generator proposed in 1986 by Lenore Blum, Manuel Blum and Michael Shub that is derived from Michael O. Rabin's one-way function.

Blum Blum Shub takes the form

$$x_{n+1} = x_n^2 \bmod M$$,

where M = pq is the product of two large primes p and q. At each step of the algorithm, some output is derived from x_{n+1}; the output is commonly either the bit parity of x_{n+1} or one or more of the least significant bits of x_{n+1}.

The seed x_{0} should be an integer that is co-prime to M (i.e. p and q are not factors of x_{0}) and not 1 or 0.

The two primes, p and q, should both be congruent to 3 (mod 4) (this guarantees that each quadratic residue has one square root which is also a quadratic residue), and should be safe primes with a small gcd((p-3)/2, (q-3)/2) (this makes the cycle length large).

An interesting characteristic of the Blum Blum Shub generator is the possibility to calculate any x_{i} value directly (via Euler's theorem):

$$x_i = \left( x_0^{2^i \bmod \lambda(M)} \right) \bmod M$$,

where $\lambda$ is the Carmichael function. (Here we have $\lambda(M) = \lambda(p\cdot q) = \operatorname{lcm}(p-1, q-1)$).

== Security ==
There is a proof reducing its security to the computational difficulty of factoring. When the primes are chosen appropriately, and O(log log M) lower-order bits of each x_{n} are output, then in the limit as M grows large, distinguishing the output bits from random should be at least as difficult as solving the quadratic residuosity problem modulo M.

The performance of the BBS random-number generator depends on the size of the modulus M and the number of bits per iteration j. While lowering M or increasing j makes the algorithm faster, doing so also reduces the security. A 2005 paper gives concrete, as opposed to asymptotic, security proof of BBS, for a given M and j. The result can also be used to guide choices of the two numbers by balancing expected security against computational cost.

== Example ==
Let $p=11$, $q=23$ and $s=3$ (where $s$ is the seed). We can expect to get a large cycle length for those small numbers, because ${\rm gcd}((p-3)/2, (q-3)/2)=2$. The generator starts to evaluate $x_0$ by using $x_{-1}=s$ and creates the sequence $x_0$, $x_1$, $x_2$, $\ldots$ $x_5$ = 9, 81, 236, 36, 31, 202. The following table shows the output (in bits) for the different bit selection methods used to determine the output.

Parity bit	Least significant bit
0 1 1 0 1 0	1 1 0 0 1 0

The following is a Python implementation that does check for primality.

import sympy


def blum_blum_shub(p1: int, p2: int, seed: int, iterations: int) -> list[int]:
    """Blum Blum Shub is a pseudorandom number generator."""
    assert p1 % 4 == 3
    assert p2 % 4 == 3
    assert sympy.isprime(p1 // 2)
    assert sympy.isprime(p2 // 2)
    n = p1 * p2
    numbers = []
    for _ in range(iterations):
        seed = (seed**2) % n
        if seed in numbers:
            print(f"The RNG has fallen into a loop at {len(numbers)} steps")
            return numbers
        numbers.append(seed)
    return numbers


print(blum_blum_shub(11, 23, 3, 100))

The following Common Lisp implementation provides a simple demonstration of the generator, in particular regarding the three bit selection methods. The requirements imposed upon the parameters p, q and s (seed) are not checked.

(defun get-number-of-1-bits (bits)
  "Returns the number of 1-valued bits in the integer-encoded BITS."
  (declare (type (integer 0 *) bits))
  (the (integer 0 *) (logcount bits)))

(defun get-even-parity-bit (bits)
  "Returns the even parity bit of the integer-encoded BITS."
  (declare (type (integer 0 *) bits))
  (the bit (mod (get-number-of-1-bits bits) 2)))

(defun get-least-significant-bit (bits)
  "Returns the least significant bit of the integer-encoded BITS."
  (declare (type (integer 0 *) bits))
  (the bit (ldb (byte 1 0) bits)))

(defun make-blum-blum-shub (&key (p 11) (q 23) (s 3))
  "Returns a function of no arguments which represents a simple
   Blum-Blum-Shub pseudorandom number generator, configured to use the
   generator parameters P, Q, and S (seed), and returning three values:
   (1) the number x[n+1],
   (2) the even parity bit of the number,
   (3) the least significant bit of the number.
   ---
   Please note that the parameters P, Q, and S are not checked in
   accordance to the conditions described in the article."
  (declare (type (integer 0 *) p q s))
  (let ((M    (* p q))       ;; M  = p * q
        (x[n] s))            ;; x0 = seed
    (declare (type (integer 0 *) M x[n]))
    #'(lambda ()
        ;; x[n+1] = x[n]^2 mod M
        (let ((x[n+1] (mod (* x[n] x[n]) M)))
          (declare (type (integer 0 *) x[n+1]))
          ;; Compute the random bit(s) based on x[n+1].
          (let ((even-parity-bit       (get-even-parity-bit       x[n+1]))
                (least-significant-bit (get-least-significant-bit x[n+1])))
            (declare (type bit even-parity-bit))
            (declare (type bit least-significant-bit))
            ;; Update the state such that x[n+1] becomes the new x[n].
            (setf x[n] x[n+1])
            (values x[n+1]
                    even-parity-bit
                    least-significant-bit))))))

;; Print the exemplary outputs.
(let ((bbs (make-blum-blum-shub :p 11 :q 23 :s 3)))
  (declare (type (function () (values (integer 0 *) bit bit)) bbs))
  (format T "~&Keys: E = even parity, L = least significant")
  (format T "~2%")
  (format T "~&x[n+1] | E | L")
  (format T "~&--------------")
  (loop repeat 6 do
    (multiple-value-bind (x[n+1] even-parity-bit least-significant-bit)
        (funcall bbs)
      (declare (type (integer 0 *) x[n+1]))
      (declare (type bit           even-parity-bit))
      (declare (type bit           least-significant-bit))
      (format T "~&~6d | ~d | ~d"
                x[n+1] even-parity-bit least-significant-bit))))

== See also ==
- Blum–Micali algorithm
