= Mean value problem =

Mathematical problem in complex analysis, disproved in 2026

The mean value problem (also known as Smale's mean value conjecture) is a problem in the mathematical field of complex analysis first posed by Stephen Smale in 1981.

The problem asks:

For a given complex polynomial $P$ of degree $d \ge 2$ (Note: The constraint on the degree is used but not explicitly stated in Smale (1981); it is made explicit, for example, in Conte (2007). The constraint is necessary. Without it, the conjecture would be false: The polynomial P(z) = z does not have any critical points.) and a complex number $z$, is there a critical point $c$ of $P$ (i.e. $P'(c) = 0$) such that

$$\left| \frac{P(z) - P(c)}{z - c} \right| \le K|P'(z)| \text{ for }K=1 \text{?}$$

The question was initially resolved by Smale for $K=4$. For a polynomial of degree $d$, the constant $K$ has to be at least $\frac{d-1}{d}$ due to the example $P(z) = z^{d} - d z$, so no constant bound better than $K=1$ can exist.

== Partial results ==
The conjecture is known to hold in special cases; for other cases, the bound on $K$ could be improved depending on the degree $d$, although no absolute bound $K<4$ is known that holds for all $d$.

In 1989, David Tischler showed that the conjecture is true for the optimal bound $K = \frac{d-1}{d}$ if $P$ has only real roots, or if all roots of $P$ have the same norm.

In 2007, Anthony Conte et al. proved that $K \le 4 \frac{d-1}{d+1}$, slightly improving on the bound $K \le 4$ for fixed $d$. Also in 2007, Edward Crane showed that $K < 4-\frac{2.263}{\sqrt{d}}$ for $d \ge 8$.

Considering the reverse inequality, Vladimir Dubinin and Toshiyuki Sugawa proved that (under the same conditions as above) there exists a critical point $c$ such that $\left| \frac{P(z) - P(c)}{z - c} \right| \ge \frac{|P'(z)|}{n 4^{n}}$. The problem of optimizing this lower bound is known as the dual mean value problem.

== See also ==
- List of unsolved problems in mathematics
- Köthe conjecture
