= SIAM Journal on Numerical Analysis =

- Discipline: Numerical analysis
- Language: English
- Edited by: Angela Kunoth

Publication details
- Former names: Journal of the Society for Industrial & Applied Mathematics, Series B: Numerical Analysis
- History: 1964–present
- Publisher: Society for Industrial and Applied Mathematics
- Frequency: Bimonthly

Standard abbreviations
- ISO 4: SIAM J. Numer. Anal.

Indexing
- CODEN: SJNAAM
- ISSN: 0036-1429 (print); 1095-7170 (web)

Links
- Journal homepage; Online access

The SIAM Journal on Numerical Analysis (SINUM; until 1965: Journal of the Society for Industrial & Applied Mathematics, Series B: Numerical Analysis) is a peer-reviewed mathematical journal published by the Society for Industrial and Applied Mathematics that covers research on the analysis of numerical methods. The journal was established in 1964 and appears bimonthly. The editor-in-chief is Angela Kunoth.
