= Wolfgang Dahmen =

German mathematician (born 1949)

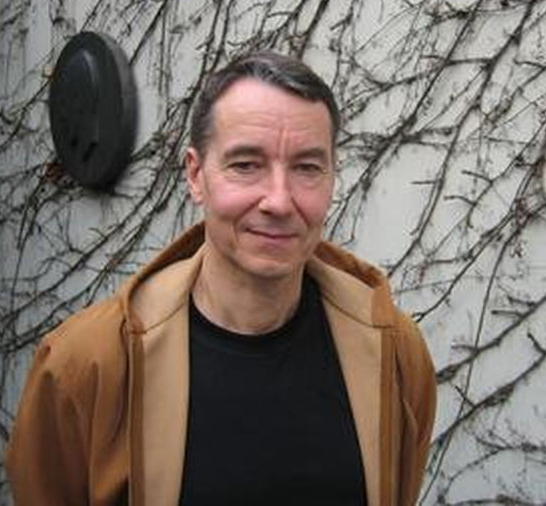
Dahmen at Oberwolfach, 2004

Wolfgang Dahmen (born 19 October 1949) is a German mathematician working in approximation theory, numerical analysis, and partial differential equations. In 2002, he was awarded the Gottfried Wilhelm Leibniz Prize and in 2011 the Gauss Lectureship. He was also a taekwondo athlete. He has been the Chair of the Society for the Foundations of Computational Mathematics (2014–).

In 2019, he was named a SIAM Fellow "for contributions to numerical methods for partial differential equations, signal processing, and learning". He was elected as a Fellow of the American Mathematical Society, in the 2025 class of fellows.
