= Michael Shub =

American mathematician

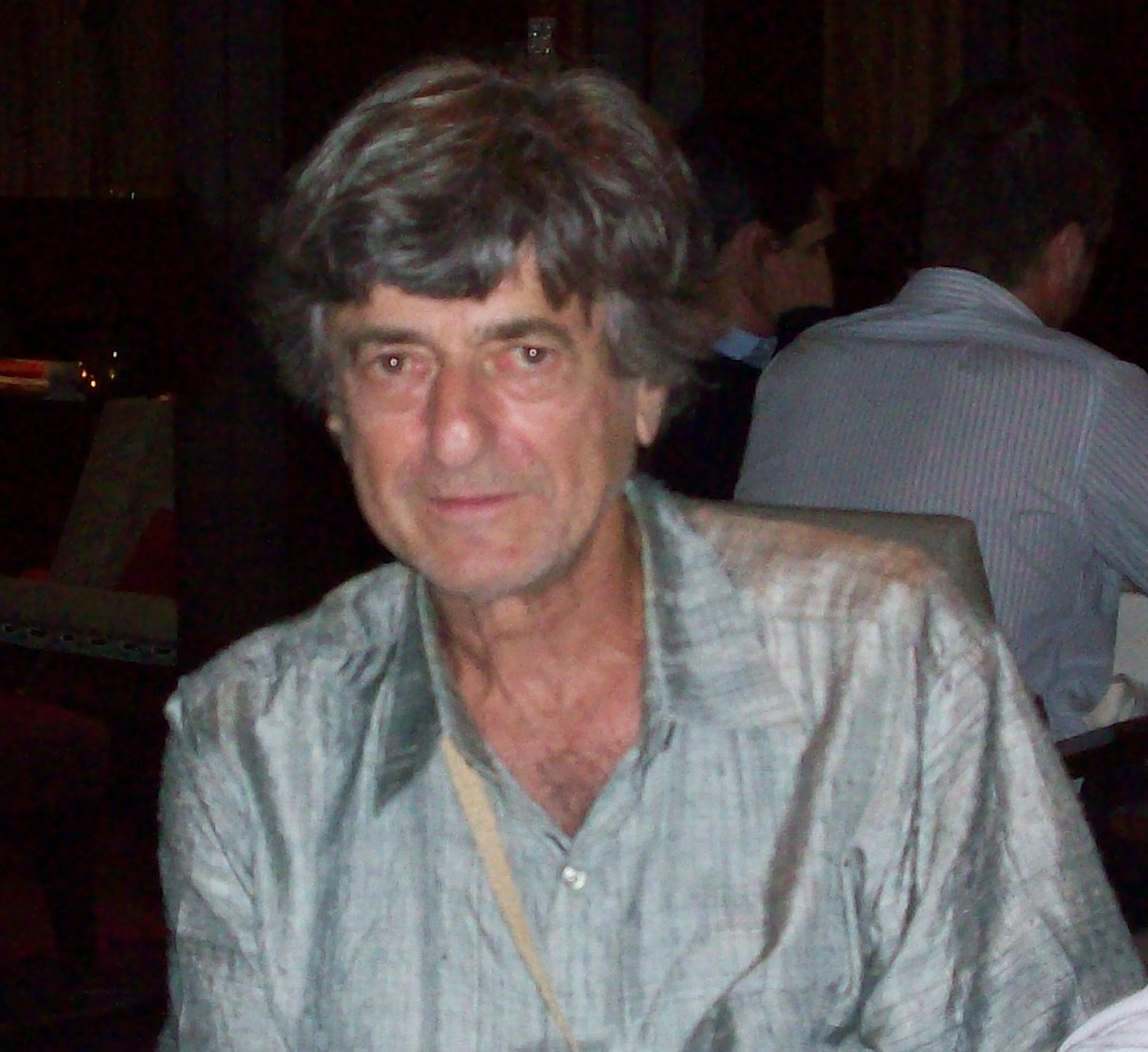
- Michael Shub in April 2012
- Born: Michael Ira Shub; August 17, 1943 (age 83)
- Education: University of California, Berkeley
- Known for: Blum Blum Shub pseudorandom number generator
- Scientific career
- Fields: Mathematics
- Workplaces: Brandeis University; University of California, Santa Cruz; Queens College at the City University of New York; Thomas J. Watson Research Center; University of Toronto; University of Buenos Aires

Michael Ira Shub (born August 17, 1943) is an American mathematician who has done research into dynamical systems and the complexity of real number algorithms.

== Career ==
=== 1967: Ph.D. and early career ===
In 1967, Shub obtained his Ph.D. degree at the University of California, Berkeley with a thesis entitled Endomorphisms of Compact Differentiable Manifolds. In his Ph.D. thesis, he introduced the notion of expanding maps, which gave the first examples of structurally stable strange attractors. His advisor was Stephen Smale.

From 1967 to 1985, he worked at Brandeis University, the University of California, Santa Cruz and the Queens College at the City University of New York. In 1974, he proposed the Entropy Conjecture, an open problem in dynamical systems, which was proved by Yosef Yomdin for $C^\infty$ mappings in 1987.

=== 1985–2004: IBM research ===
From 1985 to 2004, he joined IBM's Thomas J. Watson Research Center. In 1987, Shub published his book Global Stability of Dynamical Systems, which is often used as a reference in introductory and advanced books on the subject of dynamical systems. In 1993, Shub and Stephen Smale initiated a rigorous analysis of homotopy-based algorithms for solving systems of nonlinear algebraic equations, which has inspired much of the work in that area during the last two decades.

From 1995 to 1997, Shub was the founding chair of the Society for the Foundations of Computational Mathematics. In 2001, Shub became a founding editor of their journal, Foundations of Computational Mathematics.

==== 1986: Blum Blum Shub ====
Shub, along with coauthors Lenore and Manuel Blum, described a simple, unpredictable, secure random number generator (see Blum Blum Shub). This random generator is useful from theoretical and practical perspectives.

==== 1989: Blum–Shub–Smale machine ====
In 1989, he proposed with Lenore Blum and Stephen Smale the notion of Blum–Shub–Smale machine, an alternative to the classical Turing model of computation. Their model is used to analyse the computability of functions.

=== 2004–2010: Post-IBM ===
From 2004 to 2010, he worked at the University of Toronto. After 2010, he became a researcher at the University of Buenos Aires and at the Graduate Center of the City University of New York. Since 2016, he has been Martin and Michele Cohen Professor and Chair of the Mathematics Department at City College of New York.

== Awards and recognition ==
- 1972: Fellow of Alfred P. Sloan Foundation.
- 2000: Fellow of the American Association for the Advancement of Science.
- 2012: A conference, From Dynamics to Complexity, was organized at the Fields Institute in Toronto celebrating his work.
- 2015: Fellow of the American Mathematical Society "for contributions to smooth dynamics and to complexity theory."
- 2016: Fulbright Specialist.

== Selected publications ==
- Blum, Lenore; Blum, Manuel; Shub, Michael (1 May 1986). "A Simple Unpredictable Pseudo-Random Number Generator". SIAM Journal on Computing. 15 (2). Philadelphia, Pennsylvania: Society for Industrial and Applied Mathematics: 364–383. doi:10.1137/0215025.
- Shub, Michael (1974). "Dynamical systems, filtrations and entropy" (PDF). Bulletin of the American Mathematical Society. 80. Providence, Rhode Island: American Mathematical Society: 27–41. doi:10.1090/S0002-9904-1974-13344-6.
- Shub, Michael (1987). Global Stability of Dynamical Systems. New York City: Springer-Verlag. ISBN 978-0387962955.
- Robbin, Joel (1988). "Review: Global stability of dynamical systems by Michael Shub" (PDF). Bulletin of the American Mathematical Society. 18 (2). Providence, Rhode Island: American Mathematical Society: 248–250. doi:10.1090/s0273-0979-1988-15665-0.
- Blum, Lenore; Shub, Michael; Smale, Stephen (July 1989). "On a theory of computation and complexity over the real numbers: NP-completeness, recursive functions and universal machines" (PDF). Bulletin of the American Mathematical Society. 21. Providence, Rhode Island: American Mathematical Society: 1–47. doi:10.1090/S0273-0979-1989-15750-9.
- Shub, Michael; Smale, Stephen (1993). "Complexity of Bézout's Theorem I: Geometric Aspects". Journal of the American Mathematical Society. 6 (2). Providence, Rhode Island: American Mathematical Society: 459–501. doi:10.2307/2152805. JSTOR 2152805.
- Blum, Lenore; Cucker, Felipe; Shub, Michael; Smale, Stephen (1997). Complexity and Real Computation. New York City: Springer-Verlag. ISBN 978-0387982816.
