= Journal of Computational and Applied Mathematics =

- Discipline: Computational mathematics
- Language: English
- Edited by: Yalchin Efendiev, Taketomo Mitsui, Michael Kwok-Po Ng, Fatih Tank, Luc Wuytack

Publication details
- History: 1975–present
- Publisher: Elsevier
- Frequency: Biweekly
- Impact factor: 2.6 (2024)

Standard abbreviations
- ISO 4: J. Comput. Appl. Math.

Indexing
- CODEN: JCAMDI
- ISSN: 0377-0427 (print); 1879-1778 (web)
- LCCN: 2003233964
- OCLC no.: 57049116

Links
- Journal homepage; Online access; Online archive

The Journal of Computational and Applied Mathematics is a peer-reviewed scientific journal covering computational and applied mathematics. It was established in 1975 and is published biweekly by Elsevier. The editors-in-chief are Yalchin Efendiev (Texas A&M University), Taketomo Mitsui (Nagoya University), Michael Kwok-Po Ng (Hong Kong Baptist University) and Fatih Tank (Ankara University). According to the Journal Citation Reports, the journal has a 2021 impact factor of 2.6.
