= Stephen Smale =

American mathematician (born 1930)

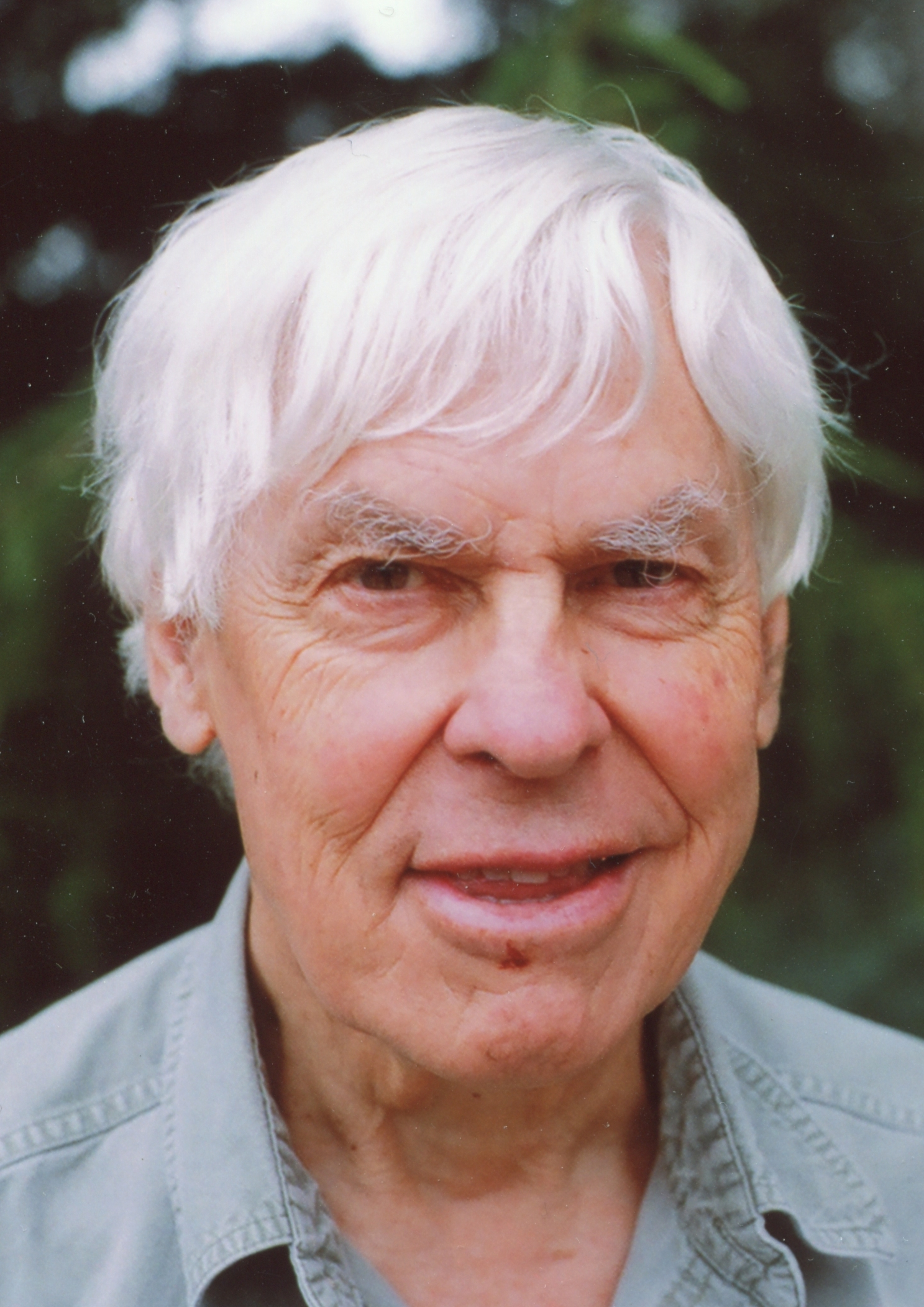
- Smale in 2008
- Born: July 15, 1930 (age 96); Flint, Michigan, U.S.
- Education: University of Michigan (BS, PhD)
- Known for: List Generalized Poincaré conjecture Handle decomposition h-cobordism theorem Homoclinic orbit Horseshoe map Smale conjecture Smale's problems Morse–Smale system Morse–Smale diffeomorphism Palais–Smale compactness condition Blum–Shub–Smale machine Smale–Williams attractor Morse–Palais lemma Regular homotopy Sard's theorem Sphere eversion Structural stability Whitehead torsion Diffeomorphism
- Awards: Wolf Prize (2007); National Medal of Science (1996); Chauvenet Prize (1988); Fields Medal (1966); Oswald Veblen Prize in Geometry (1966); Sloan Fellowship (1960)
- Scientific career
- Fields: Mathematics
- Workplaces: Toyota Technological Institute at Chicago; City University of Hong Kong; University of Chicago; Columbia University; University of California, Berkeley
- Thesis: Regular Curves on Riemannian Manifolds (1957)
- Doctoral advisor: Raoul Bott
- Doctoral students: Rufus Bowen; César Camacho; Robert L. Devaney; John Guckenheimer; Morris Hirsch; Nancy Kopell; Jacob Palis; Themistocles M. Rassias; James Renegar; Siavash Shahshahani; Mike Shub

Stephen Smale (born July 15, 1930) is an American mathematician, known for his research in topology, dynamical systems and mathematical economics. He was awarded the Fields Medal in 1966 and spent more than three decades on the mathematics faculty of the University of California, Berkeley (1960–1961 and 1964–1995), where he currently is a professor emeritus, with research interests in algorithms, numerical analysis and global analysis.

== Education and career ==
Smale was born in Flint, Michigan and entered the University of Michigan in 1948. Initially, he was placed into an honors calculus sequence taught by Bob Thrall and earned himself A's. However, his sophomore and junior years were marred with mediocre grades, mostly Bs, Cs and even an F in nuclear physics. Smale obtained his Bachelor of Science degree in 1952. Despite his grades, Smale was accepted as a graduate student at the University of Michigan's mathematics department. Yet again, Smale performed poorly in his first years, earning a C average as a graduate student. When the department chair, Hildebrandt, threatened to kick Smale out, he began to take his studies more seriously. Smale finally earned his PhD in 1957, under Raoul Bott, beginning his career as an instructor at the University of Chicago.

Early in his career, Smale was involved in controversy over remarks he made regarding his work habits while proving the higher-dimensional Poincaré conjecture. He said that his best work had been done "on the beaches of Rio." He has been politically active in various movements in the past, such as the Free Speech movement and member of the Fair Play for Cuba Committee. In 1966, having travelled to Moscow under an NSF grant to accept the Fields Medal, he held a press conference there to denounce the American position in Vietnam, Soviet intervention in Hungary and Soviet maltreatment of intellectuals. After his return to the US, he was unable to renew the grant. At one time he was subpoenaed by the House Un-American Activities Committee.

In 1960, Smale received a Sloan Research Fellowship and was appointed to the Berkeley mathematics faculty, moving to a professorship at Columbia the following year. In 1964 he returned to a professorship at Berkeley, where he has spent the main part of his career. He became a professor emeritus at Berkeley in 1995 and took up a post as professor at the City University of Hong Kong. He also amassed over the years one of the finest private mineral collections in existence. Many of Smale's mineral specimens can be seen in the book The Smale Collection: Beauty in Natural Crystals.

From 2003 to 2012, Smale was a professor at the Toyota Technological Institute at Chicago; starting August 1, 2009, he became a Distinguished University Professor at the City University of Hong Kong.

In 1988, Smale was the recipient of the Chauvenet Prize of the MAA. In 2007, Smale was awarded the Wolf Prize in mathematics.

== Research ==
Smale proved that the oriented diffeomorphism group of the two-dimensional sphere has the same homotopy type as the special orthogonal group of 3 × 3 matrices. Smale's theorem has been reproved and extended a few times, notably to higher dimensions in the form of the Smale conjecture, as well as to other topological types.

In another early work, he studied the immersions of the two-dimensional sphere into Euclidean space. By relating immersion theory to the algebraic topology of Stiefel manifolds, he was able to fully clarify when two immersions can be deformed into one another through a family of immersions. Directly from his results it followed that the standard immersion of the sphere into three-dimensional space can be deformed (through immersions) into its negation, which is now known as sphere eversion. He also extended his results to higher-dimensional spheres, and his doctoral student Morris Hirsch extended his work to immersions of general smooth manifolds. Along with John Nash's work on isometric immersions, the Hirsch–Smale immersion theory was highly influential in Mikhael Gromov's early work on development of the h-principle, which abstracted and applied their ideas to contexts other than that of immersions.

In the study of dynamical systems, Smale introduced what is now known as a Morse–Smale system. For these dynamical systems, Smale was able to prove Morse inequalities relating the cohomology of the underlying space to the dimensions of the (un)stable manifolds. Part of the significance of these results is from Smale's theorem asserting that the gradient flow of any Morse function can be arbitrarily well approximated by a Morse–Smale system without closed orbits. Using these tools, Smale was able to construct self-indexing Morse functions, where the value of the function equals its Morse index at any critical point. Using these self-indexing Morse functions as a key tool, Smale resolved the generalized Poincaré conjecture in every dimension greater than four. Building on these works, he also established the more powerful h-cobordism theorem the following year, together with the full classification of simply-connected smooth five-dimensional manifolds.

Smale also introduced the horseshoe map, inspiring much subsequent research. He also outlined a research program carried out by many others. Smale is also known for injecting Morse theory into mathematical economics, as well as recent explorations of various theories of computation.

In 1998 he compiled a list of 18 problems in mathematics to be solved in the 21st century, known as Smale's problems. This list was compiled in the spirit of Hilbert's famous list of problems produced in 1900. In fact, Smale's list contains some of the original Hilbert problems, including the Riemann hypothesis and the second half of Hilbert's sixteenth problem, both of which are still unsolved. Other famous problems on his list include the Poincaré conjecture (now a theorem, proved by Grigori Perelman), the P = NP problem, and the Navier–Stokes equations, all of which have been designated Millennium Prize Problems by the Clay Mathematics Institute.

== Books ==
- Smale, Steve (1980). The mathematics of time: essays on dynamical systems, economic processes, and related topics. New York-Berlin: Springer-Verlag. doi:10.1007/978-1-4613-8101-3. ISBN 0-387-90519-7. MR 0607330. Zbl 0451.58001.
- Blum, Lenore; Cucker, Felipe; Shub, Michael; Smale, Steve (1998). Complexity and real computation. With a foreword by Richard M. Karp. New York: Springer-Verlag. doi:10.1007/978-1-4612-0701-6. ISBN 0-387-98281-7. MR 1479636. S2CID 12510680. Zbl 0948.68068.
- Hirsch, Morris W.; Smale, Stephen; Devaney, Robert L. (2013). Differential equations, dynamical systems, and an introduction to chaos (Third edition of 1974 original ed.). Amsterdam: Academic Press. doi:10.1016/C2009-0-61160-0. ISBN 978-0-12-382010-5. MR 3293130. Zbl 1239.37001.
- Cucker, F.; Wong, R., eds. (2000). The collected papers of Stephen Smale. In three volumes. Singapore: Singapore University Press. doi:10.1142/4424. ISBN 981-02-4307-3. MR 1781696. Zbl 0995.01005.

== Important publications ==
- Smale, Stephen (1959a). "A classification of immersions of the two-sphere". Transactions of the American Mathematical Society. 90 (2): 281–290. doi:10.1090/S0002-9947-1959-0104227-9. MR 0104227. Zbl 0089.18102.
- Smale, Stephen (1959b). "The classification of immersions of spheres in Euclidean spaces". Annals of Mathematics. Second Series. 69 (2): 327–344. doi:10.2307/1970186. JSTOR 1970186. MR 0105117. Zbl 0089.18201.
- Smale, Stephen (1959c). "Diffeomorphisms of the 2-sphere". Proceedings of the American Mathematical Society. 10 (4): 621–626. doi:10.1090/S0002-9939-1959-0112149-8. MR 0112149. Zbl 0118.39103.
- Smale, Stephen (1960). "Morse inequalities for a dynamical system". Bulletin of the American Mathematical Society. 66 (1): 43–49. doi:10.1090/S0002-9904-1960-10386-2. MR 0117745. Zbl 0100.29701.
- Smale, Stephen (1961a). "On gradient dynamical systems". Annals of Mathematics. Second Series. 74 (1): 199–206. doi:10.2307/1970311. JSTOR 1970311. MR 0133139. Zbl 0136.43702.
- Smale, Stephen (1961b). "Generalized Poincaré's conjecture in dimensions greater than four". Annals of Mathematics. Second Series. 74 (2): 391–406. doi:10.2307/1970239. JSTOR 1970239. MR 0137124. Zbl 0099.39202.
- Smale, S. (1962a). "On the structure of manifolds". American Journal of Mathematics. 84 (3): 387–399. doi:10.2307/2372978. JSTOR 2372978. MR 0153022. Zbl 0109.41103.
- Smale, Stephen (1962b). "On the structure of 5-manifolds". Annals of Mathematics. Second Series. 75 (1): 38–46. doi:10.2307/1970417. JSTOR 1970417. MR 0141133. Zbl 0101.16103.
- Smale, S. (1965). "An infinite dimensional version of Sard's theorem". Amer. J. Math. 87 (4): 861–866. doi:10.2307/2373250. JSTOR 2373250.
- Smale, Stephen (1967). "Differentiable dynamical systems". Bulletin of the American Mathematical Society. 73 (6): 747–817. doi:10.1090/S0002-9904-1967-11798-1. MR 0228014.
- Blum, Lenore; Shub, Mike; Smale, Steve (1989). "On a theory of computation and complexity over the real numbers: NP-completeness, recursive functions and universal machines". Bull. Amer. Math. Soc. New Series. 21 (1): 1–46. doi:10.1090/S0273-0979-1989-15750-9.
- Shub, Michael; Smale, Stephen (1993). "Complexity of Bézout's Theorem I: Geometric Aspects". Journal of the American Mathematical Society. 6 (2). Providence, Rhode Island: American Mathematical Society: 459–501. doi:10.2307/2152805. JSTOR 2152805.
- Smale, Steve (1998). "Mathematical problems for the next century". The Mathematical Intelligencer. 20 (2): 7–15. doi:10.1007/BF03025291. MR 1631413. S2CID 1331144. Zbl 0947.01011.
- Smale, Steve (2000). "Mathematical problems for the next century". In Arnold, V.; Atiyah, M.; Lax, P.; Mazur, B. (eds.). Mathematics: frontiers and perspectives. Providence, RI: American Mathematical Society. pp. 271–294. ISBN 0-8218-2070-2. MR 1754783. Zbl 1031.00005.
- Cucker, Felipe; Smale, Steve (2002). "On the mathematical foundations of learning" (PDF). Bull. Amer. Math. Soc. New Series. 39 (1): 1–49. doi:10.1090/S0273-0979-01-00923-5.
- Cucker, Felipe; Smale, Steve (2007). "Emergent behavior in flocks". IEEE Trans. Autom. Control. 52 (5): 852–862. Bibcode:2007ITAC...52..852C. doi:10.1109/TAC.2007.895842. S2CID 206590734.*

== See also ==
- 5-manifold
- Axiom A
- Geometric mechanics
- Homotopy principle
- Mean value problem
