= Mathematical Reviews =

Scientific journal

- Discipline: Mathematics
- Language: English

Publication details
- History: 1940–present
- Publisher: American Mathematical Society (United States)

Standard abbreviations
- ISO 4: Math. Rev.

Indexing
- ISSN: 0025-5629
- OCLC no.: 1756873

Links
- Journal homepage

Mathematical Reviews is a journal published by the American Mathematical Society (AMS) that contains brief synopses, and in some cases evaluations, of many articles in mathematics, statistics, and theoretical computer science. The AMS also publishes an associated online bibliographic database called MathSciNet, which contains an electronic version of Mathematical Reviews.

== Reviews ==
Mathematical Reviews was founded by Otto E. Neugebauer in 1940 as an alternative to the German journal Zentralblatt für Mathematik, which Neugebauer had also founded a decade earlier, but which under the Nazis had begun censoring reviews by and of Jewish mathematicians. The goal of the new journal was to give reviews of every mathematical research publication. As of November 2007, the Mathematical Reviews database contained information on over 2.2 million articles. The authors of reviews are volunteers, usually chosen by the editors because of some expertise in the area of the article. It and Zentralblatt für Mathematik are the only comprehensive resources of this type. (The Mathematics section of Referativny Zhurnal is available only in Russian and is smaller in scale and difficult to access.) Often reviews give detailed summaries of the contents of the paper, sometimes with critical comments by the reviewer and references to related work. However, reviewers are not encouraged to criticize the paper, because the author does not have an opportunity to respond. The author's summary may be quoted when it is not possible to give an independent review, or when the summary is deemed adequate by the reviewer or the editors. Only bibliographic information may be given when a work is in an unusual language, when it is a brief paper in a conference volume, or when it is outside the primary scope of the Reviews. Originally the reviews were written in several languages, but later an "English only" policy was introduced. Selected reviews (called "featured reviews") were also published as a book by the AMS, but this program has been discontinued.

== Online database ==
Mathematical Reviews
- Producer: American Mathematical Society

In 1980, all the contents of Mathematical Reviews since 1940 were integrated into an electronic searchable database. Eventually the contents became part of MathSciNet, which was officially launched in 1996. MathSciNet also has extensive citation information.

== Mathematical citation quotient ==
Mathematical Reviews computes a mathematical citation quotient (MCQ) for each journal. Like the impact factor and other similar citation rates, this is a numerical statistic that measures the frequency of citations to a journal. The MCQ is calculated by counting the total number of citations into the journal that have been indexed by Mathematical Reviews over a five-year period, and dividing this total by the total number of papers published by the journal during that five-year period.

For the period 2012–2014, the top five journals in Mathematical Reviews by MCQ were:

1. Acta Numerica: MCQ 8.14
2. Publications Mathématiques de l'IHÉS: MCQ 5.06
3. Journal of the American Mathematical Society: MCQ 4.79
4. Annals of Mathematics: MCQ 4.60
5. Forum of Mathematics, Pi: MCQ 4.54

The "All Journal MCQ" is computed by considering all the journals indexed by Mathematical Reviews as a single meta-journal, which makes it possible to determine if a particular journal has a higher or lower MCQ than average. The 2018 All Journal MCQ is 0.41.

== Current Mathematical Publications ==
Current Mathematical Publications was a subject index in print format that published the newest and upcoming mathematical literature, chosen and indexed by Mathematical Reviews editors. It covered the period from 1965 until 2012, when it was discontinued.

== See also ==
- Current Index to Statistics
- IEEE Xplore
- INSPEC
- Referativnyi Zhurnal, published in former Soviet Union and now in Russia
- Web of Science
- Zentralblatt MATH, published in Germany
