= Nancy Kopell =

American mathematician (born 1942)

Nancy Jane Kopell
- Born: November 8, 1942 (age 83); New York City
- Citizenship: American
- Education: Ph.D.
- Alma mater: Cornell University; University of California, Berkeley
- Known for: Mathematical neuroscience
- Spouse: Gabriel Stolzenberg
- Awards: Sloan Fellowship; Guggenheim Fellowship; MacArthur Fellowship
- Scientific career
- Institutions: Northeastern University; Boston University
- Thesis: Commuting diffeomorphisms (1967)
- Doctoral advisor: Stephen Smale
- Website: math.bu.edu/people/nk/

Nancy Jane Kopell (born November 8, 1942, New York City) is an American mathematician and professor at Boston University. She is co-director of the Center for Computational Neuroscience and Neural Technology (CompNet). She organized and directs the Cognitive Rhythms Collaborative (CRC). Kopell received her B.A. from Cornell University in 1963 and her Ph.D. from Berkeley in 1967. She held visiting positions at the Centre National de la Recherche Scientifique in France (1970), MIT (1975, 1976–1977), and the California Institute of Technology (1976).

The focus of her research is the field of applied biomathematics and includes use of mathematical models to analyze the physiological mechanisms of brain dynamics. The techniques Kopell uses include extensions of invariant manifold theory, averaging theory, and geometric methods for singularly perturbed equations. From the peak of her career in 1990, she has contributed to over 200 published research articles in the field of biomathematics. Her current interests include topics such as: how does the brain produce its dynamics (physiological mechanisms), how do brain rhythms take part in cognition (sensory processing, attention, memory, motor control), and how can pathologies of brain dynamics help to understand symptoms of neurological diseases (Parkinson's disease, schizophrenia, epilepsy) as well as altered states of consciousness (anesthesia). She collaborates widely with experimentalists and clinicians in order to conduct research on these topics.

Kopell is a 1990 MacArthur Fellow.

== Biography ==
=== Early life and education ===
Kopell was born on November 8, 1942, and grew up on Pelham Parkway in the Bronx. Her father was an accountant and her mother and older sister also majored in mathematics. As a child, she had a severe eye problem which taught her how to cope with being "different." This ability to cope would help her successfully deal with feelings of marginalization she would later experience as a female scientist. She attributes her professional success to this ability as well as the support she received from mentors throughout her career. Her high school teachers encouraged her to go into the mathematics field.

During her undergraduate education at Cornell University, she registered for a mathematics honors program, and was the only female participant. Kopell graduated from Cornell with an A.B. in 1963.

She then decided to attend graduate school in order to "find an alternative to the more traditional life her family expected for her." Kopell originally applied to programs on the East Coast and was admitted to all of them except for one; however, after being encouraged by another student, she chose to attend school on the West Coast instead. She was admitted to the University of California, Berkeley, with a fellowship and graduated with an M.A. and a Ph.D. in 1967. At Berkeley, she did well on her exams and was known as the "bright female." However, she struggled in the early stages of her dissertation work and switched supervisors to Stephen Smale. Smale suggested a problem which Kopell almost singlehandedly solved, leading to her thesis in the field of dynamical systems which catapulted her career.

=== Academic career ===
After completing her graduate education, Kopell accepted an instructorship at the Massachusetts Institute of Technology. There, she met collaborator Lou Howard, with whom she published several articles. She later met her husband, Gabriel Stolzenberg, at Northeastern University.

While Kopell did her thesis work in theoretical mathematics, she later switched to applied mathematics.

In 1969, she joined Northeastern University as faculty, becoming a full professor in 1978. In 1986, she became a professor of mathematics at Boston University and in 2009 she became the first woman at Boston University to be named a William Fairfield Warren Distinguished Professor. She was awarded a MacArthur Foundation Fellowship in 1990 for her work developing methods of dynamical systems to attack problems of applied mathematics. She is currently Director and Co-Founder of the Cognitive Rhythms Collaborative, which consists of a group of over two dozen labs, mostly in the Boston Area, working on brain dynamics and their cognitive implications. She is also Co-Director of the Center for Computational Neuroscience and Neural Technology (CompNet).

Kopell is a member of the National Academy of Sciences and the American Academy of Arts and Sciences. She was recently selected to be an honorary member of the London Mathematical Society, a distinction given to one or two mathematicians per year worldwide. She has been awarded Sloan Guggenheim, and McArthur Fellowships, and has an honorary Ph.D. from the New Jersey Institute of Technology. She has given the Weldon Memorial Prize Lecture (Oxford), the von Neumann Lecture, and the Josiah Willard Gibbs Lecture (AMS), as well as multiple other named lectureships.

== Honors and memberships ==
- 1975 Sloan Fellowship
- 1984 Guggenheim Fellowship
- 1990 MacArthur Fellowship
- 1996 National Academy of Sciences
- 1996 American Academy of Arts and Sciences
- 1999 Josiah Willard Gibbs Lecture (American Mathematical Society)
- 2006 Weldon Memorial Prize (Oxford)
- 2007 John von Neumann Lecture (Society for Industrial and Applied Mathematics)
- 2009 Fellow of the Society for Industrial and Applied Mathematics
- 2011 Honorary Member of the London Mathematical Society
- 2013 Jürgen Moser Lecture
- 2015 Israel Brain Technologies Mathematical Neuroscience Prize
- 2015 Fellow of the American Mathematical Society
- 2016 Swartz Prize

== Selected publications ==
- Kopell, N; Howard, L N (1973). "Plane-wave solutions to reaction-diffusion equations". Studies in Applied Mathematics. 52 (4): 291–328. doi:10.1002/sapm1973524291.
- Ermentrout, George Bard; Kopell, Nancy (March 1984). "Frequency Plateaus in a Chain of Weakly Coupled Oscillators, I.". SIAM Journal on Mathematical Analysis. 15 (2): 215–237. doi:10.1137/0515019.
- Kopell, N.; Ermentrout, G. B. (September 1986). "Symmetry and phaselocking in chains of weakly coupled oscillators". Communications on Pure and Applied Mathematics. 39 (5): 623–660. doi:10.1002/cpa.3160390504.
- Kopell, N.; Ermentrout, G. B.; Whittington, M. A.; Traub, R. D. (15 February 2000). "Gamma rhythms and beta rhythms have different synchronization properties" (PDF). Proceedings of the National Academy of Sciences. 97 (4): 1867–1872. Bibcode:2000PNAS...97.1867K. doi:10.1073/pnas.97.4.1867. PMC 26528. PMID 10677548.
- Kopell, N; Ermentrout, B (Oct 2004). "Chemical and electrical synapses perform complementary roles in the synchronization of interneuronal networks". Proceedings of the National Academy of Sciences of the United States of America. 101 (43): 15482–15487. Bibcode:2004PNAS..10115482K. doi:10.1073/pnas.0406343101. PMC 524455. PMID 15489269.

== Prestigious lectures given ==
- Volmer Fries Memorial Lecture at Rensselaer Polytechnic Institute
- Mark Kac Memorial Lecture at Los Alamos National Laboratories
- 1993 University Lecture at Boston University
- Plenary Speaker at two meetings of the Society for Industrial and Applied Mathematics
- Invited Speaker at the International Congress of Mathematicians in 1983

== See also ==
- Ermentrout and Kopell Canonical Model

== Other sources ==
- Ermentrout, G. Bard; Terman, David H. (2010). Mathematical foundations of neuroscience. New York: Springer. ISBN 9780387877075.
- Kopell, Nancy (2005). "Biased Random Walk: A Brief Mathematical Biography". In Case, Bettye Anne; Leggett, Anne (eds.). Complexities: Women in Mathematics. Princeton University Press. pp. 349–354. ISBN 9780691114620.
- Kopell, N (June 2013). "Interview with Nancy Kopell". Trends in Neurosciences. 36 (6): 313–314. doi:10.1016/j.tins.2013.03.005. PMID 23731518. S2CID 205404489.
