= Marian Pour-El =

American mathematical logician

Marian Boykan Pour-El (April 29, 1928 – June 10, 2009) was an American mathematical logician who did pioneering work in computable analysis.

== Early life and education ==
Marian Boykan was born in 1928 in New York City; her parents were dentist Joseph Boykan and his wife Matilda (Mattie, née Caspe), a former laboratory technician and housewife. As a young girl, she performed ballet at the Metropolitan Opera House, and this influenced her later life where she was often more comfortable speaking before large audiences than in small groups. Although she wanted to attend the Bronx High School of Science, it was at that time only for boys; instead, she went to a girls' school, Hunter College High School.

Her parents were unwilling to pay the tuition for private college for her, so she went to Hunter College, an inexpensive local higher-education establishment primarily aimed at training schoolteachers. There she earned a bachelor's degree in physics in 1949. She also completed enough courses in mathematics for a second major but was not allowed to have two majors by Hunter College's rules.

She was accepted to Harvard University for graduate studies in mathematics, with full support, as the only woman in the program. At Harvard, she earned a master's degree in 1951 and a Ph.D. in mathematical logic in 1958. She was very isolated and lonely at Harvard, with few friends and, initially, no other students even willing to sit next to her in her classes. The nearest restroom to her classes was in a different building, and one of the few buildings with air conditioning in the summers was off-limits to women, even when she was assigned as an instructor to a class in that building. Because there were no logicians at Harvard at that time, she spent five years of her time as a visiting student at the University of California, Berkeley. Her doctoral dissertation was Computable Functions.

== Career ==
After finishing her doctorate, Pour-El joined the mathematics faculty at Pennsylvania State University. She earned her tenure there in 1962. During a sabbatical from 1962 to 1964 at the Institute for Advanced Study, she worked with Kurt Gödel.

She moved in 1964 to the University of Minnesota, and was promoted to full professor there in 1968. Except for a year from 1969 to 1970 as a visiting professor at the University of Bristol, she remained at the University of Minnesota until her retirement in 2000. At Minnesota, her doctoral students included Jill Zimmerman (Ph.D. 1990), later the James M. Beall Professor of Mathematics and Computer Science at Goucher College, Maryland.

In 1980 Pour-El was elected as a Member at Large for the AMS and served until 1982.

== Contributions ==
Pour-El's early work concerned recursion theory, and included joint work with William Alvin Howard,^{[H]} Saul Kripke,^{[K]} Donald A. Martin,^{[M]} and Hilary Putnam.^{[P]} In a 1974 publication, she studied analogues of computability for analog computers. She proved that, for her formulation of this problem, the functions that can be computed by such computers are the same as the functions that define solutions to algebraic differential equations.^{[A]} This result, a refinement of the work of Claude Shannon, became known as the Shannon–Pour-El thesis.

In the late 1970s Pour-El began working on computable analysis. Her "most famous and surprising result", co-authored with Minnesota colleague J. Ian Richards, was that for certain computable initial conditions, determining the behavior of the wave equation is an undecidable problem.^{[W]} Their result was later taken up by Roger Penrose in his book The Emperor's New Mind; Penrose used this result as a test case for the Church–Turing thesis, but concluded that the non-smoothness of the initial conditions makes it implausible that a computational device could use this phenomenon to exceed the limits of conventional computing. Freeman Dyson used the same result to argue for the evolutionary superiority of analog to digital forms of life.

With Richards, Pour-El was the author of a book, Computability in Analysis and Physics.^{[C]}

== Recognition ==
Pour-El was elected to the Hunter College Hall of Fame in 1975, and as a Fellow of the American Association for the Advancement of Science in 1983. A symposium was held in honor of Pour-El in Japan in 1993.

== Personal life ==
As a student at Berkeley, Pour-El met her husband, Israeli biochemist Akiva Pour-El. They had one daughter, Ina. Her husband followed her to Penn State after completing his doctorate a year later, and he later followed her, again, when she moved to Minnesota. They lived separately for several long intervals, most notably from 1969 to 1975 when her husband taught in Illinois, and Pour-El wrote an article in 1981 on how having a long-distance relationship worked for her.^{[S]}

Pour-El's brother is music composer Martin Boykan.

== Selected publications ==
H.	Pour-El, Marian Boykan; Howard, William A. (1964), "A structural criterion for recursive enumeration without repetition", Zeitschrift für Mathematische Logik und Grundlagen der Mathematik, 10 (8): 105–114, doi:10.1002/malq.19640100802, MR 0168457

P.	Pour-El, Marian Boykan; Putnam, Hilary (1965), "Recursively enumerable classes and their application to recursive sequences of formal theories", Archiv für Mathematische Logik und Grundlagenforschung, 8 (3–4): 104–121, doi:10.1007/BF01976264, MR 0207555, S2CID 120423051

K.	Pour-El, Marian Boykan; Kripke, Saul (1967), "Deduction-preserving "recursive isomorphisms" between theories", Fundamenta Mathematicae, 61 (2): 141–163, doi:10.4064/fm-61-2-141-163, MR 0252226. Announced under the same title in Bull. AMS 1967, MR 0215713.

M.	Martin, D. A.; Pour-El, M. B. (1970), "Axiomatizable theories with few axiomatizable extensions", Journal of Symbolic Logic, 35 (2): 205–209, doi:10.2307/2270510, JSTOR 2270510, MR 0280374, S2CID 35727955

A.	Pour-el, Marian Boykan (1974), "Abstract computability and its relation to the general purpose analog computer (some connections between logic, differential equations and analog computers)", Transactions of the American Mathematical Society, 199: 1–28, doi:10.1090/s0002-9947-1974-0347575-8, JSTOR 1996870, MR 0347575

W.	Pour-El, Marian Boykan; Richards, Ian (1981), "The wave equation with computable initial data such that its unique solution is not computable", Advances in Mathematics, 39 (3): 215–239, doi:10.1016/0001-8708(81)90001-3, MR 0614161

S.	Pour-El, Marian Boykan (1981), "Spatial separation in family life: A mathematician's choice", Mathematics Tomorrow, New York: Springer, pp. 187–194, doi:10.1007/978-1-4613-8127-3_19, ISBN 978-1-4613-8129-7, MR 0618280. Reprinted in Case, Bettye Anne; Leggett, Anne M. (2005), Complexities: Women in Mathematics, Princeton University Press, ISBN 9780691114620.

C.	Pour-El, Marian B.; Richards, J. Ian (1989), Computability in Analysis and Physics, Perspectives in Mathematical Logic, Berlin: Springer, doi:10.1007/978-3-662-21717-7 (inactive 8 August 2025), ISBN 3-540-50035-9, MR 1005942; reprinted 2016 in the Perspectives in Logic series of the Association for Symbolic Logic and Cambridge University Press.
