= Digital physics =

Idea that the universe is fundamentally computational or informational

Digital physics is a family of speculative proposals in philosophy, holding that the universe is at its most fundamental level digital, informational or computational in character: that physical reality is either the output of a computer program or is itself a computational process. This metaphysical position is also known as pancomputationalism.

The hypothesis that the universe is a digital computer was first set out by Konrad Zuse in a 1967 paper and in his 1969 monograph Rechnender Raum ("Calculating Space"). The term "digital physics" was coined in 1978 by Edward Fredkin, who taught a graduate course under that name at MIT and later came to prefer the label "digital philosophy". Fredkin's collaborations with Tommaso Toffoli and Norman Margolus on reversible and conservative logic made MIT's Information Mechanics group the principal early institutional home of the programme.

Digital physics is not a single theory but a cluster of positions that differ over what is claimed to be discrete (space, time, state, or information), over which computational formalism is taken to be exact (cellular automata, Turing machines, quantum circuits, graph rewriting systems), and over whether the claim is empirical, metaphysical, or both. It overlaps with, but is distinct from, the simulation hypothesis, which concerns whether our universe is being run by agents in some other universe rather than whether it is computational at all.

Digital physics is not broadly accepted. No version of it has yielded a confirmed novel prediction, and existing discrete models are in tension with several continuous symmetries of established theory, such as rotational symmetry, Lorentz symmetry and gauge invariance. Deterministic classical variants also fall within the class of local hidden-variable theories constrained by Bell's theorem and the experiments that test it.

== Terminology ==
Two claims are often run together but are logically independent.

- Discreteness: that fundamental physical quantities take at most finitely many values, so that there are no genuinely real-valued magnitudes at the bottom level. On this view, apparent continuity is an emergent, coarse-grained appearance.
- Informational primacy, or digitalism: that information is ontologically fundamental and physical properties derive from it. This position was compressed by John Archibald Wheeler into the slogan "it from bit".

One can hold discreteness without informational primacy (many approaches to quantum gravity do), or informational primacy without discreteness (as in several information-theoretic reconstructions of quantum theory, which use continuous state spaces).

== History ==
=== Precursors of pancomputationalism ===
The idea that number or structure is ontologically basic has Pythagorean antecedents, and Leibniz's work on binary arithmetic and a universal calculus is frequently cited as an ancestor. The more direct scientific lineage runs through the thermodynamic treatment of information: Leó Szilárd's 1929 analysis of Maxwell's demon, Claude Shannon's information theory, and Rolf Landauer's demonstration that logically irreversible operations carry an unavoidable thermodynamic cost, summarised in his dictum that information is physical.

=== Zuse and calculating space ===
Konrad Zuse, the builder of the Z3, proposed in 1967 that the physical behaviour of the universe is computed at a basic level by the universe itself, possibly on a cellular automaton, which he called Rechnender Raum. Zuse is generally credited as the first pancomputationalist in the ontic sense.

=== Information Mechanics at MIT ===
Edward Fredkin developed the position independently and, from the late 1970s, encouraged a group at MIT's Laboratory for Computer Science around Toffoli and Margolus. Their central technical concern was whether computation could be made compatible with the reversibility and conservation laws of microphysics; the Fredkin gate and Toffoli gate came out of this work, as did the Billiard-ball computer model. Fredkin later formulated his position as digital mechanics, a proposal that physics is a reversible universal cellular automaton.

The 1981 MIT conference on Physics and Computation was a turning point. Richard Feynman's contribution argued that a classical local system such as a cellular automaton cannot efficiently reproduce quantum correlations, and proposed quantum simulators instead. This argument both damaged the classical version of digital physics and helped launch quantum computing.

=== 1980s and the informational turn ===
David Deutsch formulated in 1985 what is now called the Church-Turing-Deutsch principle: that every finitely realisable physical system can be perfectly simulated by a universal model computing machine operating by finite means. Deutsch's own conclusion was that the appropriate universal machine is a quantum, not a classical, one. Stephen Wolfram independently advanced a related claim in the same year, arguing that physical processes are bounded by the capabilities of universal computation.

Wheeler, from the late 1980s, argued that every physical entity derives its existence from binary yes-or-no answers elicited by acts of observation, a position he condensed as "it from bit". His formulation was influential well beyond digital physics, and is frequently invoked by researchers who do not accept discreteness at all.

=== Twenty-first century ===
Stephen Wolfram's A New Kind of Science (2002) argued that simple programs generically produce complex behaviour, that this suffices to account for complexity in nature, and that a simple rule underlies fundamental physics. Reception among physicists and computer scientists was largely critical, with reviewers objecting that the novel claims were unproven and the proven claims not novel.

Three developments broadened the field after 2000. First, Seth Lloyd and others recast the computational-universe claim in quantum information terms. Second, the holographic principle and the Bekenstein bound gave the idea of finite information density a foothold in mainstream quantum gravity. Third, Gerard 't Hooft and Wolfram each produced sustained technical programmes, respectively a deterministic cellular-automaton interpretation of quantum mechanics and a hypergraph-rewriting model of spacetime.

== Varieties ==
=== Cellular-automaton models ===
The oldest and best-known form takes the universe to be a cellular automaton: a lattice of cells, each in one of finitely many states, updating in discrete steps according to a local rule. For this to hold, all fundamental magnitudes must be discrete, and space and time must be either fundamentally discrete or emergent from the automaton's processing. Zuse, Fredkin, Toffoli and Margolus all worked within this frame.

'T Hooft's cellular automaton interpretation is the most technically developed contemporary version. It treats quantum mechanics as a tool for analysing an underlying deterministic system, constructs a mapping between ontological ("beable") states and quantum basis states, and addresses Bell's theorem by rejecting statistical independence of measurement settings from hidden variables; a position known as superdeterminism.

=== Computable ensemble theories ===
Building on Zuse's assumption that the history of the universe is computable, Jürgen Schmidhuber argued that the simplest explanation of the universe is a short program systematically executing all possible programs, and developed algorithmic priors over computable universes. Gregory Chaitin emphasised algorithmic incompressibility as a limit on any such account.

Max Tegmark's Computable Universe Hypothesis is a restriction of his Mathematical Universe Hypothesis: the mathematical structure that is the external physical reality is defined by computable functions. Tegmark notes that this is a substantive and possibly false restriction, since most mathematical structures are not computable.

=== Quantum-computational models ===
On the quantum version, the universe is not a classical digital computer but a quantum one, manipulating qubits rather than bits. Lloyd derived quantitative bounds on this reading: applying the Margolus-Levitin theorem and the Bekenstein bound, he computed that the universe can have performed at most about 10^{120} elementary operations on about 10^{90} bits since the Big Bang.

The quantum version is considerably less radical than the classical one: because it does not eliminate continuity, it can be read as a reformulation of standard quantum mechanics in the vocabulary of quantum information, with no change in empirical content. That is both its strength and, for critics, its principal weakness.

Related but distinct are the informational reconstructions of quantum theory: Anton Zeilinger's foundational principle, QBism, and the axiomatic derivations of Chiribella, D'Ariano and Perinotti, which derive the Hilbert-space formalism from information-theoretic axioms without asserting that the world is digital.

=== Ur-theory ===
Carl Friedrich von Weizsäcker's theory of ur-alternatives builds quantum theory axiomatically from binary alternatives (Ure), the simplest possible empirically decidable questions. Weizsäcker used the theory to argue for the three-dimensionality of space and to estimate the entropy of matter falling into a black hole. It is an informational rather than a discrete-spacetime proposal.

=== Graph- and network-based models ===
Later work replaces the fixed lattice with a dynamically rewritten discrete structure, which sidesteps the objection that a lattice imposes preferred directions on space. The Wolfram Physics Project, launched in 2020, models space as a hypergraph transformed by simple rewriting rules satisfying the Church-Rosser property; arguing that special relativity, general relativity and features of quantum mechanics emerge in appropriate limits.

Discrete structures also appear in mainstream quantum gravity without any computational commitment: causal set theory, loop quantum gravity spin networks, and causal dynamical triangulations all posit discreteness while remaining agnostic about whether the universe computes.

=== Simulation-based versions ===
A minority of proponents add that the computation is being run deliberately by agents outside our universe. Nick Bostrom's simulation argument is logically independent of digital physics, it is a statistical argument about the relative frequency of simulated and unsimulated observers, and does not require the universe to be discrete. Conflation of the two is common in popular coverage and is a recurring source of confusion in the literature.

== Core arguments ==
=== Against the physical continuum ===
A recurring motivation is the claim that the continuum is a mathematical idealisation with no physical warrant: that infinitely precise real-valued magnitudes are never measured and never needed, and that admitting them imports infinities into physics gratuitously. Wheeler argued in this vein that there is no evidence for the existence of the number continuum in physics.

=== Finite information density ===
The Bekenstein bound places an upper limit on the entropy (hence on the information) that can be contained in a region of given size and energy, and the holographic principle indicates that the degrees of freedom in a volume scale with its bounding area rather than its volume. Proponents treat these as independent evidence that information content is fundamentally finite. Critics respond that finite entropy does not entail a discrete state space, and that the holographic principle is a statement about degrees of freedom, not about pixels.

== Criticism ==
=== Continuous symmetries ===
The most cited technical objection is that discrete models break symmetries that are extremely well confirmed. Fritz proved that for any periodic graph in d dimensions, the set of attainable velocities of a particle hopping along one edge per timestep forms a polytope, and a polytope necessarily has distinguished directions; hence no periodic graph yields an isotropic velocity set. In the classical setting this is a no-go theorem for the emergence of isotropic space from a discrete structure. Sabine Hossenfelder gave a related argument that no Poincaré-invariant network with a locally finite distribution of nodes exists in Minkowski spacetime of any dimension.

Three responses are made. Causal set theory replaces the regular lattice with a random Poisson sprinkling of points into a continuum, which yields discreteness without picking out preferred directions, a result stated as "discreteness without symmetry breaking". Second, proponents appeal to emergence: in condensed matter physics, lattice systems are known to exhibit symmetries at low energy that the underlying lattice does not possess, and string-net condensation on a lattice of qubits has been shown to give rise to emergent gauge bosons and fermions. On this reading the symmetries of established theory need only hold in the infrared, with lattice artefacts suppressed as irrelevant operators, using the same reasoning that allows lattice QCD to recover continuum results. Third, models based on dynamically rewritten structures rather than fixed lattices are not covered by Fritz's theorem, which is a statement about periodic graphs.

Critics reply that emergent symmetry in condensed matter is emergence within a continuum spacetime, so it does not establish that spacetime itself can emerge from a discrete substrate, and that suppression of lattice artefacts in the infrared is an empirical constraint on the lattice scale rather than a demonstration that exact symmetry is recovered.

=== Bell's theorem ===
Deterministic classical cellular-automaton models are local hidden-variable theories, and as such are constrained by Bell's theorem and by the loophole-free Bell tests performed since 2015. 'T Hooft's response is to deny measurement independence, and Hossenfelder and Palmer have argued that the standard objections to superdeterminism (that it is fine-tuned, conspiratorial or unfalsifiable) rest on misunderstandings, and that superdeterministic models can be given empirical content. Proponents also note that the objection is restricted in scope: quantum-computational and quantum-cellular-automaton versions of digital physics are not local hidden-variable theories, so Bell's theorem does not bear on them.

=== Feynman's objection ===
Richard Feynman argued in 1981 that a local classical system cannot efficiently reproduce quantum probability amplitudes, it remains a standing objection to the classical formalism.

Two responses are offered. The objection concerns efficiency rather than possibility: a classical automaton can reproduce quantum statistics with exponential overhead, which is an obstacle only if one also requires the underlying computation to be efficient. More substantively, the objection does not apply to quantum cellular automata, which are discrete and local yet reproduce relativistic quantum dynamics in the continuum limit, and which have been proposed as the appropriate successor formalism.

=== Metaphysical objections ===
The metaphysical claim that computation is prior to physical substrate attracts the objection that purely computational entities lack the causal and qualitative properties actually observed, and that no satisfactory account has been given of how they could give rise to them. Traditionally computation requires a medium: there is no software without hardware.

Proponents typically accept the reversal and adopt one of three positions: that computations are abstract mathematical entities, a computational form of Pythagoreanism; that all there is to the universe is computational structure, a computational form of ontic structural realism; or that the computation is implemented in a substrate belonging to some other universe, as in the simulation reading.

=== Aaronson's arguments ===
Scott Aaronson's review of A New Kind of Science pressed a related point about graph-based models, arguing that they cannot reproduce the observed violations of Bell's inequality without introducing a preferred frame or otherwise abandoning the features that motivated the models. Aaronson also criticized the Physics Project, characterising the framework as an infinitely flexible philosophy, able to accommodate any physical result after the fact. Project collaborator Jonathan Gorard partly agreed, describing the current stage as fitting rather than prediction.

== Implications ==
Participants in the debate have drawn a range of consequences from the supposition that some version of digital physics is correct. These differ sharply depending on which version is at issue.

=== The status of probability ===
Classical deterministic versions entail that quantum randomness is not fundamental. On 't Hooft's cellular automaton interpretation the quantum state is a bookkeeping device for an underlying deterministic evolution, so probabilities express ignorance of the ontological state rather than objective chance. This would make physical probability epistemic throughout, aligning it with interpretations on which probability is a measure of rational credence rather than a physical propensity.

Superdeterministic variants deny the statistical independence of measurement settings from hidden variables, and critics argue that this undermines the inferential practices on which experimental science depends, since correlations between settings and the systems measured would corrupt ordinary statistical reasoning. Defenders reply that the objection misconstrues what superdeterminism requires. Separately, computational irreducibility implies that a system may be fully deterministic while remaining unpredictable to any observer without the resources to simulate it step by step, so determinism at the substrate would not translate into predictability in practice.

=== Intuitionistic and constructive mathematics ===
Several authors hold that a computational universe calls for constructive rather than classical mathematics. Under the Curry–Howard correspondence a constructive proof is a program, so a theory framed in intuitionistic logic has computational content by construction; Arsiwalla, Elshatlawy and Rickles make this the basis of their claim that constructivism is the appropriate foundation for a pregeometric physics. Gisin argues on independent grounds that treating physical quantities as finite-information objects, as intuitionistic mathematics does, changes what classical physics says about determinism, and Bridges has examined how far physics can be reconstructed constructively.

A related consequence is the loss of the physical continuum as a fundamental structure. If no physical magnitude carries infinite information, real-valued quantities are idealisations and geometry must be founded finitistically or constructively, a position with a longer history in the philosophy of mathematics. Nothing in this follows from discreteness alone: the constructive route reaches it by restricting the logic while retaining continuous structure, and the two strategies are not equivalent.

=== Physical bounds ===
If the universe computes, its computational capacity is finite and calculable. Reversible formulations imply that information is conserved at the fundamental level, which was the original motivation for conservative logic. A strong reading of the Church–Turing–Deutsch principle would additionally exclude physical processes that compute functions beyond the reach of a universal machine, ruling out hypercomputation.

=== Symmetries and observability ===
Discrete substrates generically imply that the continuous symmetries of established theory hold only approximately, which is what makes the programme empirically approachable at all: departures from Lorentz or rotational invariance would be expected at some scale, and their absence constrains candidate models.

=== Mind and substrate independence ===
If computation is substrate-independent and ontologically fundamental, then whatever is essential to a physical system is preserved under reimplementation, which bears directly on computationalism about the mind and on the coherence of the simulation scenarios that some proponents endorse. Critics take the same premise to expose a difficulty, arguing that purely computational entities lack the causal and qualitative properties that physical systems are observed to have.

== Proposed empirical tests ==
Digital physics is hard to test because the relevant scale is far below current reach.

=== Lattice signatures in cosmic rays ===
Beane, Davoudi and Savage explored the consequences of the universe being simulated on a cubic spacetime lattice, taking lattice QCD as the model. They derived a bound on the inverse lattice spacing of roughly 10^{11} GeV from the high-energy cutoff of the cosmic-ray spectrum, and noted that such a scenario could reveal itself as rotational-symmetry breaking in the arrival directions of the highest-energy cosmic rays.

=== Holographic noise and Fermilab ===
The Fermilab Holometer, proposed by Craig Hogan in 2009, used paired Michelson interferometers to search for Planck-scale positional jitter predicted by one model of holographic spacetime. After a year of data-taking the collaboration reported a null result, ruling out Hogan's specific model at high statistical significance. The experiment was controversial even before it reported.

=== Lorentz-invariance violation ===
Discrete spacetime generically predicts energy-dependent photon dispersion. Observations of GRB 090510 by the Fermi Gamma-ray Space Telescope constrained any linear energy-dependent variation in the speed of light to above the Planck scale, tightening the space available to naive discrete models.

== Reception ==
Digital physics occupies an unusual position: its constituent ideas (that information is physical, that entropy bounds are fundamental, that spacetime may be discrete) are individually mainstream, while the conjunction claimed by digital physicists is not. Discreteness is pursued seriously in quantum gravity without computational ontology; informational reconstructions of quantum theory are pursued without discreteness; and the thermodynamics of computation is an established field.

Sceptics observe that the programme has generated no experimental result of its own and that its advocates appear driven by a preference for exact computational models rather than by evidence that such models are correct. Defenders reply that its value lies in reframing questions in quantum gravity and quantum foundations, and that a deterministic substrate remains a live option even if presently untested.

== See also ==
- Cellular automaton
- Church–Turing–Deutsch principle
- Constructive mathematics
- Causal set theory
- Holographic principle
- It from bit
- Mathematical universe hypothesis
- Philosophy of information
- Simulation hypothesis
- Ultrafinitism
