= Jeff Paris =

Jeff Paris may refer to:

- Jeff Paris (mathematician) (born 1944), British mathematician
- Jeff Paris (musician), American vocalist, keyboardist and guitarist
