= Korten =

Korten may refer to:

- Korten, Bulgaria, a village in the municipality of Nova Zagora, Sliven Province
- Korten Ridge, a geographical feature in Graham Land, Antarctica
- David Korten (born 1937), American author and political activist
- Fran Korten, wife of David, publisher of Yes! (U.S. magazine)
- Günther Korten (1898-1944), German colonel general and Chief of the General Staff of the Luftwaffe in World War II
- Marianne Korten, Argentine-German mathematician
