= Philip Welch =

British mathematician (born 1954)

- Born: Philip David Welch; 6 January 1954 (age 72)
- Education: University College London; University of Oxford
- Awards: Inamori Foundation Young Researcher's Prize 1998
- Scientific career
- Fields: Mathematics, Mathematical Logic, Philosophy
- Workplaces: University of Bristol, UCLA, Kobe University
- Doctoral advisor: Robin Gandy

Philip David Welch (born 6 January 1954) is a British mathematician known for his contributions to logic and set theory. He is Professor of Pure Mathematics at the School of Mathematics, University of Bristol. He was the Coordinating Editor of the Journal of Symbolic Logic in 2016, President of the British Logic Colloquium from 2017 to 2022 and President of the European Set Theory Society from 2021 to 2025.

== Biography ==
Welch attended Lancing College. After obtaining a BSc in mathematics from University College London in 1975, he attended Exeter College at the University of Oxford, taking an MSc in mathematical logic in 1976 and his DPhil in 1979, under the supervision of Robin Gandy. His dissertation was entitled Combinatorial Principles in the Core Model.

He worked as an assistant at the Seminar für Logik at the University of Bonn from 1980 to 1981, then as an SERC Research Fellow at Wolfson College, Oxford, from 1981 until 1983. Following a Royal Society European Research Fellowship at the University of Bonn, and the Free University of Berlin (1984), he held a position as an assistant professor at UCLA until 1986. In 1997 he left Bristol in order to set up a research group in set theory at the Graduate School of Science and Technology at Kobe University, Japan. He subsequently held a Guest Professorship at the Kurt Gödel Research Center at the University of Vienna (2000–2001) and a Mercator Professorship at the University of Bonn (2001) before returning to Bristol in 2002. He was appointed as a Professor there in 2004. Apart from research articles he is co-author with Aaron Beller and Ronald Jensen of Coding the Universe. In 2023, Welch was awarded a Senior Fellowship of the Zukunftskollegs at the University of Konstanz.
