= Qubit field theory =

Generalization of quantum field theory

A qubit field theory is a quantum field theory in which the canonical commutation relations involved in the quantisation of pairs of observables are relaxed. Specifically, it is a quantum field theory in which, unlike most other quantum field theories, the pair of observables is not required to always commute.

== Theory ==
In many ordinary quantum field theories, constraining one observable to a fixed value results in the uncertainty of the other observable being infinite (cf. uncertainty principle), and as a consequence there is potentially an infinite amount of information involved. In the situation of the standard position-momentum commutation (where the uncertainty principle is most commonly cited), this implies that a fixed, finite, volume of space has an infinite capacity to store information. However, Bekenstein's bound hints that the information storage capacity ought to be finite. Qubit field theory seeks to resolve this issue by removing the commutation restriction, allowing the capacity to store information to be finite; hence the name qubit, which derives from quantum-bit or quantised-bit.

David Deutsch has presented a group of qubit field theories which, despite not requiring commutation of certain observables, still presents the same observable results as ordinary quantum field theory.

J. Hruby has presented a supersymmetric extension.
