= Computability in Analysis and Physics =

1989 monograph by Marian Pour-El and J. Ian Richards

- First edition
- Author: Marian Pour-El, J. Ian Richards
- Language: English
- Series: Perspectives in Mathematical Logic
- Publisher: Springer-Verlag
- Publication date: 1989

Computability in Analysis and Physics is a monograph on computable analysis by Marian Pour-El and J. Ian Richards. It was published by Springer-Verlag in their Perspectives in Mathematical Logic series in 1989, and reprinted by the Association for Symbolic Logic and Cambridge University Press in their Perspectives in Logic series in 2016.

== Topics ==
The book concerns computable analysis, a branch of mathematical analysis founded by Alan Turing and concerned with the computability of constructions in analysis. This area is connected to, but distinct from, constructive analysis, reverse mathematics, and numerical analysis. The early development of the field was summarized in a book by Oliver Aberth, Computable Analysis (1980), and Computability in Analysis and Physics provides an update, incorporating substantial developments in this area by its authors. In contrast to the Russian school of computable analysis led by Andrey Markov Jr., it views computability as a distinguishing property of mathematical objects among others, rather than developing a theory that concerns only computable objects.

After an initial section of the book, introducing computable analysis and leading up to an example of John Myhill of a computable continuously differentiable function whose derivative is not computable, the remaining two parts of the book concerns the authors' results. These include the results that, for a computable self-adjoint operator, the eigenvalues are individually computable, but their sequence is (in general) not; the existence of a computable self-adjoint operator for which 0 is an eigenvalue of multiplicity one with no computable eigenvectors; and the equivalence of computability and boundedness for operators. The authors' main tools include the notions of a computability structure, a pair of a Banach space and an axiomatically characterized set of its sequences, and of an effective generating set, a member of the set of sequences whose linear span is dense in the space.

The authors are motivated in part by the computability of solutions to differential equations. They provide an example of computable and continuous initial conditions for the wave equation (with however a non-computable gradient) that lead to a continuous but not computable solution at a later time. However, they show that this phenomenon cannot occur for the heat equation or for Laplace's equation.

The book also includes a collection of open problems, likely to inspire its readers to more research in this area.

== Audience and reception ==
The book is self-contained, and targeted at researchers in mathematical analysis and computability; reviewers Douglas Bridges and Robin Gandy disagree over which of these two groups it is better aimed at. Although co-author Marian Pour-El came from a background in mathematical logic, and the two series in which the book was published both have logic in their title, readers are not expected to be familiar with logic.

Despite complaining about the formality of the presentation and that the authors did not aim to include all recent developments in computable analysis, reviewer Rod Downey writes that this book "is clearly a must for anybody whose research is in this area", and Gandy calls it "an interesting, readable and very well written book".
