= Constructor theory =

Theory in fundamental physics

Constructor theory is a proposal for a new mode of explanation in fundamental physics, developed by physicists David Deutsch and Chiara Marletto, at the University of Oxford, since 2012. Constructor theory expresses physical laws exclusively in terms of which physical transformations, or tasks, are possible versus which are impossible, and why. By allowing such counterfactual statements into fundamental physics, it allows new physical laws to be expressed, such as the constructor theory of information.

== Overview ==
The fundamental elements of the theory are tasks: the abstract specifications of transformations as input–output pairs of attributes. A task is impossible if there is a law of physics that forbids its being performed with arbitrarily high accuracy, and possible otherwise. When it is possible, a constructor for it can be built, again with arbitrary accuracy and reliability. A constructor is an entity that can cause the task to occur while retaining the ability to cause it again. Examples of constructors include a heat engine (a thermodynamic constructor), a catalyst (a chemical constructor) or a computer program controlling an automated factory (an example of a programmable constructor).

The theory was developed by physicists David Deutsch and Chiara Marletto. It draws together ideas from diverse areas, including thermodynamics, statistical mechanics, information theory, and quantum computation.

Quantum mechanics and all other physical theories are claimed to be subsidiary theories, and quantum information becomes a special case of superinformation.

Chiara Marletto's constructor theory of life builds on constructor theory.

== Motivations ==
According to Deutsch, current theories of physics, based on quantum mechanics, do not adequately explain why some transformations between states of being are possible and some are not. For example, a drop of dye can dissolve in water, but the reverse transformation, the dye spontaneously clumping back together, is never observed in practice. While the microscopic laws of motion are time-reversible (meaning such a reversal is not strictly forbidden for individual trajectories, only astronomically unlikely), constructor theory reframes the question: rather than asking what will happen given initial conditions, it asks whether a constructor — a device that could reliably cause the reverse transformation and retain the ability to do so again — is possible. In constructor-theoretic terms, dissolving dye is a possible task, but its transpose is impossible: no constructor for reliably reversing the process can exist under the laws of physics, even though the underlying dynamics are time-symmetric. This allows an exact statement of the second law of thermodynamics without the approximations that plague statistical-mechanical formulations. Constructor theory provides an explanatory framework built on the transformations themselves, rather than the components.

Information has the property that a given statement might have said something else, and one of these alternatives would not be true. The untrue alternative is said to be "counterfactual". Conventional physical theories do not model such counterfactuals. However, the link between information and such physical ideas as the entropy in a thermodynamic system is so strong that they are sometimes identified. For example, the area of a black hole's event horizon is a measure both of the hole's entropy and of the information that it contains, as per the Bekenstein bound. Constructor theory is an attempt to bridge this gap, providing a physical model that can express counterfactuals, thus allowing the laws of information and computation to be viewed as laws of physics.

== Constructor theory of information ==
The constructor theory of information, published in Proceedings of the Royal Society A in 2015 by Deutsch and Marletto, proposes exact laws of physics expressing the regularities that allow information to be physically instantiated. Unlike previous information theories that treat information as an a priori mathematical concept, this theory holds that the nature and properties of information are determined entirely by the laws of physics.

An information medium is defined in purely constructor-theoretic terms as a physical system with a set of at least two attributes such that two transformations are possible: any permutation of these attributes (the "flip"), and the copying of these attributes onto another system (the "copy"). These two counterfactual properties constitute the physical basis of classical information.

A central principle is the interoperability principle: the combination of two information media is itself an information medium. This requires certain physical interactions to exist in nature and explains why information can be transferred between different physical substrates regardless of their specific physical details.

The theory introduces superinformation media as information media on which certain additional tasks are impossible — specifically, it is impossible to copy all information-carrying states simultaneously, and all transformations must be reversible. Deutsch and Marletto show that these properties give rise to all the known qualitative differences between quantum information and classical information, including the impossibility of cloning, the existence of complementary variables, the objective unpredictability of measurement outcomes, and locally inaccessible information in entangled systems. Quantum information is thus shown to be a special case of superinformation.

== See also ==
- Calculating Space
- Computability theory
- Undecidable problem
- Quantum circuit
- Generalized probabilistic theory

== Bibliography ==
- Deutsch, David (December 2013). "Constructor theory". Synthese. 190 (18): 4331–4359. arXiv:1210.7439. Bibcode:2013Synth.190.4331D. doi:10.1007/s11229-013-0279-z. S2CID 16083339.
- Marletto, Chiara (2021). The Science of Can and Can't. Penguin. ISBN 9780525521921.
