= Chiara Marletto =

Italian theoretical physicist

- Education: Polytechnic University of Torino; University of Oxford
- Known for: The Science of Can and Can't
- Scientific career
- Fields: Quantum theory of information Constructor theory
- Workplaces: University of Oxford
- Website: www.chiaramarletto.com

Chiara Marletto is an Italian theoretical physicist at Wolfson College, Oxford. She is a pioneer in the field of constructor theory, counterfactuals and a generalization of the quantum theory of information.

== Life ==
Marletto grew up in Turin. She graduated from the Polytechnic University of Torino, and the University of Oxford, where she studied with Artur Ekert.

Together with David Deutsch, she has developed constructor theory. She is a member of New Frontiers Quantum Hub.

== Works ==
- Chiara, Marletto (2021). The Science of Can and Can't. Penguin. ISBN 978-0-525-52192-1.
- Marletto, Chiara (1 July 2014). "Constructor Theory of Life". Journal of the Royal Society Interface. 12 (104). arXiv:1407.0681v2. doi:10.1098/rsif.2014.1226. PMC 4345487. PMID 25589566.
- Deutsch, David; Marletto, Chiara (2015). "Constructor theory of information". Proceedings of the Royal Society A: Mathematical, Physical and Engineering Sciences. 471 (2174) 20140540. The Royal Society. Bibcode:2014RSPSA.47140540D. doi:10.1098/rspa.2014.0540. ISSN 1364-5021. PMC 4309123. PMID 25663803.
