= Jill Zimmerman =

Computer scientist

- Born: Jill Loraine Zimmerman
- Education: Purdue University (B.S., 1981); University of Minnesota (Ph.D., 1990)
- Spouse: James Gil de Lamadrid (m. 1985)
- Scientific career
- Fields: Recursion theory; Computation theory
- Workplaces: Goucher College
- Thesis: Classes of Grzegorczyk-computable real numbers (1990)
- Doctoral advisor: Marian Pour-El

Jill Loraine Zimmerman is an American computer scientist and the James M. Beall Professor of Mathematics and Computer Science at Goucher College. Since 2006, she has been the head of the Goucher Robotics Lab.

== Early life and education ==
Zimmerman is from Naperville, Illinois. While in high school in 1975, Zimmerman and her father built a computer with four kilobytes of memory after being inspired by the January cover story of Popular Mechanics by Ed Roberts on building your own computers. Zimmerman later remarked that it was this same article that inspired Bill Gates.

In 1981, Zimmerman earned a Bachelor of Science with distinction in Computer and Informational Sciences with a minor in Mathematics from Purdue University. At graduation, she ranked among the top ten students in the School of Science and was a member of Phi Beta Kappa and Phi Kappa Phi. Upon enrolling in doctoral studies at the University of Minnesota Institute of Technology, Zimmerman was named a Corporate Associate Fellow. In 1990, she earned a doctorate in computer science, specializing in computational and recursion theory. Zimmerman completed her dissertation titled Classes of Grzegorczyk-Computable Real Numbers under her doctoral advisor Marian Pour-El.

== Career ==
Zimmerman joined the faculty at Goucher College in 1990 as a visiting professor. She was the principal investigator for the "Computer Science, Mathematics, and Engineering Scholarship Program" where she received $220,000 from the National Science Foundation to be conducted between January 2002 – December 2005.

Zimmerman's research in computer science spans programming languages, compiler design, and robotics, with notable collaboration with Gil de Lamadrid. Beginning in the early 1990s, Zimmerman and de Lamadrid focused on robotics pathfinding, co-authoring two papers in Robotica in 1993 titled "Avoidance of Obstacles with Unknown Trajectories: Locally Optimal Paths and Path Complexity, Parts I and II." This work examined methods for navigating robots around unpredictable obstacles, contributing to early research on path complexity and optimization in robotics.

Zimmerman's interests later evolved toward programming languages, especially hybrid functional-object-oriented systems. In 2000, she and de Lamadrid developed the IncH Hope compiler, a compiler for the functional language Hope designed for the Java Virtual Machine, which they presented at the International Workshop on the Implementation of Functional Languages in Aachen. They continued this work over several years, presenting updates at various conferences, including the International Conference on Programming Languages and Compilers in 2006 and the International Conference on Engineering and Mathematics in Bilbao in 2007.

Zimmerman has run the Goucher Robotics Lab since 2006. She is the James M. Beall Professor of Mathematics and Computer Science at Goucher College. In 2011, Zimmerman and de Lamadrid introduced FOBS, a hybrid language combining functional and object-oriented paradigms. They presented their findings at the International Conference on Software Engineering and Real Practices, later publishing the comprehensive study "Core FOBS: A Hybrid Functional and Object-Oriented Language" in Computer Languages, Systems & Structures in 2012.

== Personal life ==
In 1985, Zimmerman married computer science professor James Gil de Lamadrid.

== Selected works ==
- de Lamadrid, James Gil; Zimmerman, Jill (July 1993). "Avoidance of obstacles with unknown trajectories: locally optimal paths and path complexity, Part I". Robotica. 11 (4). Cambridge University Press: 299–308. doi:10.1017/S0263574700016556. S2CID 20347479.
- de Lamadrid, James Gil; Zimmerman, Jill (September 1993). "Avoidance of obstacles with unknown trajectories: locally optimal paths and path complexity, Part II". Robotica. 11 (5). Cambridge University Press: 403–412. doi:10.1017/S0263574700016957. S2CID 251234261.
- de Lamadrid, James Gil; Zimmerman, Jill (October 2012). "Core FOBS: A hybrid functional and object-oriented language". Computer Languages, Systems & Structures. 38 (3): 214–241. doi:10.1016/j.cl.2012.04.002.
