= Jeff Paris (mathematician) =

British mathematician (born 1944)

Jeff Paris FBA
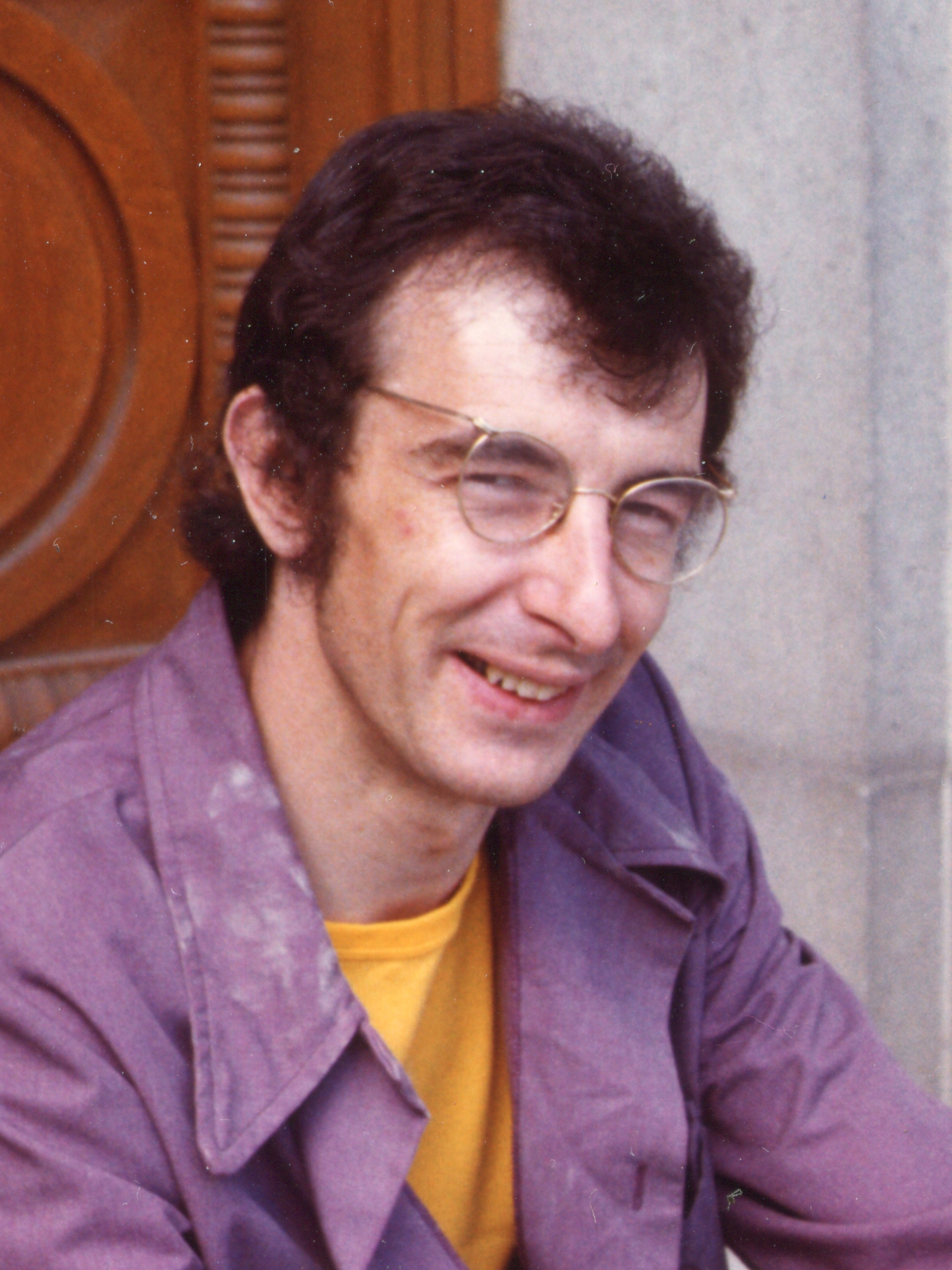
- Paris in 1974
- Born: Jeffrey Bruce Paris; 15 November 1944 (age 81)
- Education: University of Manchester
- Known for: Paris–Harrington theorem; Kirby–Paris theorem
- Children: 6, including Jasmin
- Awards: Whitehead Prize (1983)
- Scientific career
- Fields: Mathematical logic
- Workplaces: University of Manchester
- Thesis: Large Cardinals and the Generalized Continuum Hypothesis (1969)
- Doctoral advisor: Robin Gandy
- Website: oldwww.ma.man.ac.uk/~jeff/

Jeffrey Bruce Paris FBA (born 15 November 1944) is a British mathematician and Professor of Logic in the School of Mathematics at the University of Manchester.

== Education ==
Paris gained his doctorate supervised by Robin Gandy at Manchester in 1969 with a dissertation on Large Cardinals and the Generalized Continuum Hypothesis.

== Research and career ==
Paris is known for his work on mathematical logic, in particular provability in arithmetic, uncertain reasoning and inductive logic with an emphasis on rationality and common sense principles.

The Paris–Harrington theorem is a natural Ramsey-theoretic statement that is expressible in Peano arithmetic, but is not provable within this system, an illustration of Gödel's first incompleteness theorem.

=== Awards and honours ===
Paris was awarded the Whitehead Prize in 1983 and elected a Fellow of the British Academy (FBA) in 1999.

== Personal life ==
Paris was married to Malvyn Loraine Blackburn until 1983 when he married Alena Vencovská. He has three sons and three daughters including runner Jasmin Paris.
