= Complexities: Women in Mathematics =

2005 book edited by Case and Leggett

- Editor: Bettye Anne Case, Anne M. Leggett
- Language: English
- Publisher: Princeton University Press
- Publication date: 2005
- Publication place: United States
- ISBN: 0-691-11462-5

Complexities: Women in Mathematics is an edited volume on women in mathematics that "contains the stories and insights of more than eighty female mathematicians". It was edited by Bettye Anne Case and Anne M. Leggett, based on a collection of material from the Newsletter of the Association for Women in Mathematics, and published by Princeton University Press in 2005 (ISBN 0-691-11462-5).

== Topics ==
The book contains over 100 articles, by over 70 authors, divided into five sections. The first of these, "Inspiration", discusses the work of famous women in mathematics (such as Sofya Kovalevskaya, Julia Robinson, and Emmy Noether) and of women mathematicians from the 18th and 19th centuries, offering insights into their personal life as well as their mathematics. Next, "Joining Together" covers the history of the Association for Women in Mathematics and related topics in the organization of women in mathematics including European Women in Mathematics and the participation of women at the International Congress of Mathematicians.

The middle section, "Choices and Challenges", covers the problems facing women in contemporary mathematics, and includes a statistical quantification of these problems by Case and Leggett. "Celebration" is a collection of plenary talks and other materials from the Olga Taussky-Todd Celebration of Careers for Women in Mathematics, a conference held in 1999 to celebrate women in mathematics; its plenary speakers were Christa Binder, Evelyn Boyd Granville, Lisa Goldberg, Fern Hunt, Diane Lambert, Cathleen Synge Morawetz, Linda Petzold, Helene Shapiro, Richard S. Varga, Margaret H. Wright, and Lani Wu. The final chapter, "Into a New Century", consists of essays by the youg women mathematicians of the time the book was published, many of them in non-academic careers. A collection of photographs from 1975 to 2003 is included as an appendix.

Despite its material on the difficulties faced by women in mathematics, the tone of the book is "factual and upbeat", in many cases covering ordinary mathematical careers with no overt discrimination, and celebratory rather than encyclopedic.

== Audience and reception ==
The book is aimed at any woman interested in a mathematical career and anyone else "interested in the struggle and development of female mathematicians", and is "intended to encourage young women to enter mathematics". Reviewer Peggy Kidwell suggests that it would be of interest to historians of mathematics in its documentation of many current practices. And reviewer Shandelle Henson recommends it to all professional mathematicians, to provide history and context to the struggles still faced by some of their students, to help face down their own prejudices, and to avoid backsliding in the progress we have made as a society to reduce the obstacles for women in mathematics.

A small complaint of Kidwell is that there is no bibliography of related literature on women in mathematics. A. E. L. Davis, a British reviewer, criticizes the US-centric focus of the book, as does Argentinian-born mathematician Marianne Korten. Davis writes that "only parts" of it would be of interest to British readers, calls the first chapter's coverage of historical women in mathematics "rather disappointing" compared to the more encyclopedic Women of Mathematics: A Bio-Bibliographic Sourcebook by Louise Grinstein and Paul Campbell, and criticizes the Todd Celebration section as too specialized and technical for the audience of the book. Nevertheless, Davis recommends the final section of perspectives from young women mathematicians "to teachers everywhere who would like to promote mathematics to their high-flyers". And both Davis and reviewer Gwen Spencer agree that the book provides "valuable practical advice" to women mathematicians on balancing families and careers and handling two-body job searching, and examples of how to address these issues that may also be helpful for institutions aiming to treat women better. Korten singles out the essays by Cora Sadosky, Susan Landau, Karen E. Smith, and Helen Moore as speaking particularly strongly to her.

More simply, reviewer Erica Voolich, a schoolteacher, writes "The book is exactly what I need in school."
