= Discrete =

Discrete may refer to:

- Discrete particle or quantum in physics, for example in quantum theory
- Discrete device, an electronic component with just one circuit element, either passive or active, other than an integrated circuit
- Discrete group, a group with the discrete topology
- Discrete category, category whose only arrows are identity arrows
- Discrete mathematics, the study of structures without continuity
- Discrete optimization, a branch of optimization in applied mathematics and computer science
- Discrete probability distribution, a random variable that can be counted
- Discrete space, a simple example of a topological space
- Discrete spline interpolation, the discrete analog of ordinary spline interpolation
- Discrete time, non-continuous time, which results in discrete-time samples
- Discrete variable, non-continuous variable
- Discrete pitch, a pitch with a steady frequency, rather than an indiscrete gliding, glissando or portamento, pitch
- Discrete color scheme, for separately coloring sortable data
