= David Deutsch =

British theoretical physicist (born 1953)

David Deutsch FRS
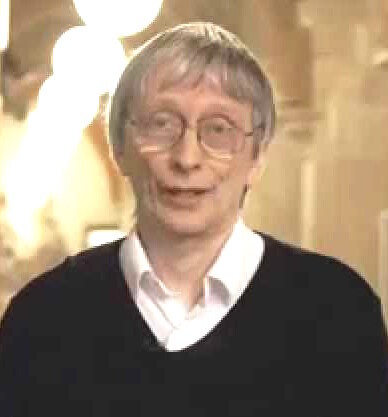
- Deutsch in 2017
- Born: David Elieser Deutsch; 18 May 1953 (age 73); Haifa, Israel
- Education: William Ellis School; Clare College, Cambridge (BA); Wolfson College, Oxford (DPhil)
- Known for: Quantum Turing machine; Church–Turing–Deutsch principle; Deutsch–Jozsa algorithm; Quantum logic gate; Quantum error correction; Qubit field theory; Constructor theory; Deutsch-Wallace approach; D-CTC condition
- Awards: IOP Dirac Prize (1998); ICTP Dirac Medal (2017); Micius Quantum Prize (2018); Isaac Newton Medal (2021); Breakthrough Prize in Fundamental Physics (2023)
- Scientific career
- Fields: Theoretical physics Quantum information science
- Workplaces: University of Oxford; Clarendon Laboratory
- Thesis: Boundary effects in quantum field theory (1978)
- Doctoral advisor: Dennis Sciama; Philip Candelas
- Doctoral students: Artur Ekert
- Website: www.daviddeutsch.org.uk

David Elieser Deutsch (/dɔɪtʃ/ DOYTCH; born 18 May 1953) is a British physicist at the University of Oxford who is often described as the "father of quantum computing". He is a visiting professor in the Department of Atomic and Laser Physics at the Centre for Quantum Computation (CQC) in the Clarendon Laboratory of the University of Oxford. He pioneered the field of quantum computation by formulating a description for a quantum Turing machine, as well as specifying an algorithm designed to run on a quantum computer. He is a proponent of the many-worlds interpretation of quantum mechanics.

== Education ==
Deutsch was born to a Jewish family in Haifa, Israel, on 18 May 1953, the son of Oskar and Tikva Deutsch. He moved to the UK with his family in 1956 at age 3. David attended Geneva House school in Cricklewood, London. His parents owned and ran the Alma restaurant on Cricklewood Broadway. He later attended William Ellis School in Highgate before reading Natural Sciences at Clare College, Cambridge, and taking Part III of the Mathematical Tripos. He went on to Wolfson College, Oxford for his doctorate in theoretical physics on quantum field theory in curved space-time, supervised by Dennis Sciama and Philip Candelas.

== Career and research ==
His work on quantum algorithms began with a 1985 paper, expanded with Richard Jozsa in 1992, to produce the Deutsch–Jozsa algorithm, one of the first examples of a quantum algorithm that is exponentially faster than any possible deterministic classical algorithm. In his nomination for election as a Fellow of the Royal Society (FRS) in 2008, his contributions were described as:

[having] laid the foundations of the quantum theory of computation, and has subsequently made or participated in many of the most important advances in the field, including the discovery of the first quantum algorithms, the theory of quantum logic gates and quantum computational networks, the first quantum error-correction scheme, and several fundamental quantum universality results. He has set the agenda for worldwide research efforts in this new, interdisciplinary field, made progress in understanding its philosophical implications (via a variant of the many-universes interpretation) and made it comprehensible to the general public, notably in his book The Fabric of Reality.

Since 2012, he has been working on constructor theory, a new approach to formulating fundamental physics in which laws are expressed not in terms of initial conditions and equations of motion, but in terms of which physical transformations are possible and which are impossible. Together with Chiara Marletto, he published a paper in December 2014 entitled "Constructor theory of information", which conjectures that information can be expressed solely in terms of which transformations of physical systems are possible and which are impossible.

=== The Fabric of Reality ===
In his 1997 book The Fabric of Reality Deutsch details his views on quantum mechanics, and explains his "Theory of Everything". It aims not at the reduction of everything to particle physics, but rather mutual support among multiversal, computational, epistemological and evolutionary principles. His theory of everything is somewhat emergentist rather than reductive. There are four strands to his theory:

1. Hugh Everett's many-worlds interpretation of quantum physics, which Deutsch argues best explains quantum indeterminacy, quantum nonlocality and quantum interference.
2. Karl Popper's epistemology, especially its anti-inductivism and requiring a realist (non-instrumental) interpretation of scientific theories, as well as its emphasis on taking seriously those bold conjectures that resist falsification.
3. Alan Turing's theory of computation, especially as developed in Deutsch's Turing principle, in which the Universal Turing machine is replaced by Deutsch's universal quantum computer. ("The theory of computation is now the quantum theory of computation.")
4. Richard Dawkins' refinement of Darwinian evolutionary theory and the modern evolutionary synthesis, especially the ideas of replicator and meme as they integrate with Popperian problem-solving (the epistemological strand).

=== The Beginning of Infinity ===
Deutsch's second book, The Beginning of Infinity: Explanations that Transform the World, was published on 31 March 2011. In this book, he views the British Enlightenment of the 17th and 18th centuries as near the beginning of a potentially unending sequence of purposeful knowledge creation. He examines the nature of knowledge, memes, and how and why creativity evolved in humans. He argues that all progress, whether scientific, philosophical or cultural, originates from the search for good explanations.

=== Awards and honours ===
The Fabric of Reality was shortlisted for the Rhone-Poulenc science book award in 1998. Deutsch was awarded the Dirac Prize of the Institute of Physics in 1998, and the Edge of Computation Science Prize in 2005. In 2017, he received the Dirac Medal of the International Centre for Theoretical Physics (ICTP). Deutsch is linked to Paul Dirac through his doctoral advisor Dennis Sciama, whose doctoral advisor was Dirac. Deutsch was elected a fellow of the Royal Society (FRS) in 2008. In 2018, he received the Micius Quantum Prize. In 2021, he was awarded the Isaac Newton Medal and Prize. On September 22, 2022, he was awarded the Breakthrough Prize in Fundamental Physics, shared with Charles H. Bennet, Gilles Brassard and Peter Shor.

== Personal life ==
Deutsch is a founding member of the parenting and educational method Taking Children Seriously.

=== Views on Antisemitism and Zionism ===
Deutsch describes antisemitism as a recurring pattern of irrational thinking, present in many cultures, whose function is to justify harming Jews simply for being Jews. He argues that "the pattern" persists because, when old justifications for hating Jews lose relevance, new ones are invented to take their place. Deutsch compares this phenomenon to the way gold retains its high value, not because of any inherent quality, but because people know that other people value it. He regards Zionism as the contemporary Jewish response to this pattern and identifies himself as an atheist Zionist.

=== Views on Brexit ===
Deutsch supported Brexit, with his advocacy quoted by then-government adviser, Dominic Cummings, and reported by The New Yorker in January 2020.

Michael Gove mentioned Deutsch's viewpoint during a BBC Brexit debate. Regarding the debate, Deutsch later commented:

In Britain there is a clear path if you have a grievance, you can join a pressure-group, the pressure-group will pressure the government, or you can see your MP, and the MP will see the grievance building up, and so-on. Whereas, Europe is structured in such a way that it's very difficult to know whom to address your grievance to, or what they could do about it.

Deutsch was not involved in any campaign advocacy for Brexit. His public remarks on the subject were quoted by Cummings and Gove on their own initiative, as Deutsch later made clear.

== See also ==
- Deutsch gate
- Wigner's friend
- Quantum cellular automaton
- Quantum mechanics of time travel
