= Marianne Korten =

Argentine-German mathematician

Marianne Kathe Korten is an Argentine-German mathematician who works in the United States as a professor of mathematics at Kansas State University. Her research expertise concerns partial differential equations and particularly free boundary problems.

== Education and career ==
Korten is a dual citizen of Argentina and Germany. After a licenciatura at the University of Buenos Aires in Argentina, Korten completed her Ph.D. there in 1993. Her doctoral dissertation, Soluciones generalizadas, localmente integrables, de la ecuación $u_t=\Delta(u-1)_+$, was supervised by Julio E. Bouillet.

She continued at the University of Buenos Aires as a teaching and research associate until 1998. After visiting Johns Hopkins University in the US, Marie and Louis Pasteur University in France, and the University of Louisville in the US, she became an assistant professor of mathematics at Kansas State University in 2000. At that time, and for several years following, she was the only female faculty member in the department. She was promoted to associate professor in 2006, and to full professor in 2009.

At Kansas State University, Korten has organized an annual research conference, the Prairie Analysis Seminar, since 2003. She has directed the SuMAR Math Research Experience for Undergraduates since 2010 and the Center for the Integration of Undergraduate, Graduate, and Postdoctoral Research since 2013.

== Recognition ==
Kansas State University gave Korten their K-State Women of Distinction Award in 2013, and the Commerce Bank and W.T. Kemper Foundation Presidential Faculty and Staff Award for Distinguished Services to Historically Under-Represented Minority Students in 2022.

Korten was named a Fellow of the Association for Women in Mathematics, in the 2025 class of fellows, "for her deep commitment to diversity and access in mathematics, supporting the diverse personal lives of mathematicians as students and faculty, helping us achieve success through AWM forums, online mentoring, regional advocacy, and summer research programs".
