= Bettye Anne Case =

American mathematician

Bettye Anne Busbee Case is Olga Larson Professor Emerita of Mathematics at Florida State University. Her mathematical research concerns complex variables; she has also published on mathematics education and the history of mathematics. She is the editor of the books A Century of Mathematical Meetings (American Mathematical Society, 1996) and Complexities: Women in Mathematics (with Anne M. Leggett, Princeton University Press, 2005).

== Education and career ==
Case graduated from the University of Alabama in 1962. She earned her Ph.D. in 1970 from the same university; her dissertation, On Non-Analytic Functions Related to a System of Partial Differential Equations, was supervised by Mario O. González. She taught at the Florida Institute of Technology and then at Tallahassee Community College for nine years before joining the Florida State University faculty as an associate professor in 1982.

Case was the founding director of both the undergraduate program in actuarial science and the graduate area financial mathematics at Florida State. She was active member of the Association for Women in Mathematics, and coordinated their meetings at mathematics conferences from 1984 to 2015.

== Recognition ==
Florida State named Case the Olga Larson Professor in 2004. In 2012, Florida State created the Bettye Anne Case Scholarship in Actuarial Science to recognize Case for her work in establishing the actuarial sciences program at Florida State in the 1990s. Florida State also established the Bettye Anne Case Actuarial Science Award to honor Case. In 2016 the Association for Women in Mathematics presented Case a Lifetime Service Award in recognition for her many decades of service to the AWM, particularly as Meetings Coordinator and long time member of the Executive Committee. In 2018 she was honored as one of the inaugural Fellows of the Association for Women in Mathematics. Florida State University has a scholarship in Actuarial Science named after her.
