= Anne M. Leggett =

American mathematical logician

- Born: May 28, 1947 (age 79); Columbus, Ohio
- Education: Ohio State University; Yale University
- Known for: Mathematical logic
- Awards: Fellow of the Association for Women in Mathematics
- Scientific career
- Fields: Mathematics
- Workplaces: Loyola University Chicago
- Thesis: Maximal $\alpha$-r.e. sets and their complements (1973)
- Doctoral advisor: Manuel Lerman

Anne Marie Leggett (born May 28, 1947) is an American mathematical logician. She is an associate professor emerita of mathematics at Loyola University Chicago.

Leggett was the editor-in-chief of the bi-monthly newsletter of the Association for Women in Mathematics (AWM), a position she held continuously from 1977 until the January-February 2024 issue. Leggett described her tenure as AWM Newsletter Editor in the article This and That: My Time as AWM Newsletter Editor which appeared in the volume Fifty Years of Women in Mathematics: Reminiscences, History, and Visions for the Future of AWM. She has served on the Executive Committee of the AWM since 1977 and the AWM Policy and Advocacy Committee (2008-2015). With Bettye Anne Case, she is the editor of the book Complexities: Women in Mathematics (with Anne M. Leggett, Princeton University Press, 2005). Leggett received an Alpha Sigma Nu Book Award for Complexities in 2006.

== Education and career ==
Leggett did her undergraduate studies at Ohio State University, and completed her Ph.D. in 1973 at Yale University. Her dissertation, Maximal $\alpha$-r.e. sets and their complements, was supervised by Manuel Lerman.

She became a C. L. E. Moore instructor at the Massachusetts Institute of Technology in 1973, and was also on the faculties of Western Illinois University and the University of Texas at Austin. In 1982, she married another mathematician, Gerard McDonald (1946–2012), and in 1983, they both joined the Loyola University Chicago faculty.

== Recognition ==
Leggett was chosen to be part of the 2019 class of fellows of the Association for Women in Mathematics, "for extraordinary contributions in promoting opportunities for women in the mathematical sciences through AWM and as a teacher and scholar; for her amazing and steady work as editor of the AWM Newsletter since 1977; and for her invaluable leadership and guidance." In 2025, she received the AWM Distinguished Service Award, "in recognition of an individual who has promoted and supported women in mathematics through exceptional and sustained volunteer service to the AWM."
