= Robin Gandy =

British mathematician and logician

- Portrait photograph of Robin Gandy
- Born: Robin Oliver Gandy; 22 September 1919; Rotherfield Peppard, Oxfordshire, England
- Died: 20 November 1995 (aged 76); Oxford, England
- Education: Abbotsholme School; University of Cambridge (PhD)
- Known for: Recursion theory
- Scientific career
- Fields: Mathematical logic
- Workplaces: University of Manchester; University of Leicester; University of Leeds; Stanford University; University of California, Los Angeles; University of Oxford
- Thesis: On Axiomatic Systems in Mathematics and Theories in Physics (1953)
- Doctoral advisor: Alan Turing
- Doctoral students: Martin Hyland; Jane Kister; Jeff Paris; Philip Welch; Simon Thompson; Douglas Bridges; Derek Goldrei

Robin Oliver Gandy (22 September 1919 – 20 November 1995) was a British mathematician and logician. He was a friend, student, and associate of Alan Turing, having been supervised by Turing during his PhD at the University of Cambridge, where they worked together.

== Education and early life ==
Robin Gandy was born in the village of Rotherfield Peppard, Oxfordshire, England. A great-great-grandson of the architect and artist Joseph Gandy (1771–1843), he was the son of Thomas Hall Gandy (1876–1948), a general practitioner, and Ida Caroline née Hony (1885–1977), a social worker and later an author. His brother was the diplomat Christopher Gandy and his sister was the physician Gillian Gandy.

Educated at Abbotsholme School in Derbyshire, Gandy took two years of the Mathematical Tripos, at King's College, Cambridge, before enlisting for military service in 1940. During World War II, he worked on radio intercept equipment at Hanslope Park, where Alan Turing was working on a speech encipherment project, and he became one of Turing's lifelong friends and associates. In 1946, he completed Part III of the Mathematical Tripos, then began studying for a PhD under Turing's supervision. He completed his thesis, On axiomatic systems in mathematics and theories in Physics, in 1952. He was a member of the Cambridge Apostles.

== Career and research ==
Gandy held positions at the University of Leicester, the University of Leeds, and the University of Manchester. He was a visiting associate professor at Stanford University from 1966 to 1967 and held a similar position at University of California, Los Angeles in 1968. In 1969, he moved to Wolfson College, Oxford, where he became Reader in Mathematical Logic.

Gandy is known for his work in recursion theory. His contributions include the Spector–Gandy theorem, the Gandy Stage Comparison theorem, and the Gandy Selection theorem. He also made a significant contribution to the understanding of the Church–Turing thesis, and his generalisation of the Turing machine is called a Gandy machine.

Gandy died in Oxford, England on 20 November 1995.

== Legacy ==
The Robin Gandy Buildings, a pair of accommodation blocks at Wolfson College, Oxford, are named after Gandy. A one-day centenary Gandy Colloquium was held on 22 February 2020 at the College in Gandy's honour, including contributions by some of his students; the speakers were Marianna Antonutti Marfori (Munich), Andrew Hodges (Oxford), Martin Hyland (Cambridge), Jeff Paris (Manchester), Göran Sundholm (Leiden), Christine Tasson (Paris), and Philip Welch (Bristol).
