= Brouwer–Hilbert controversy =

Foundational controversy in twentieth-century mathematics

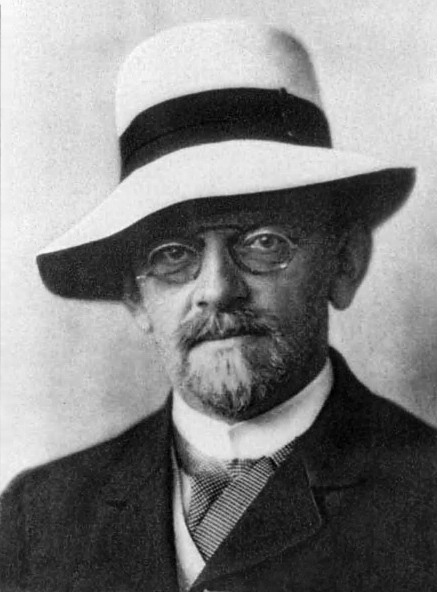
David Hilbert (1862–1943)

The Brouwer–Hilbert controversy (German: Grundlagenstreit, lit. 'foundational debate') was a debate in twentieth-century mathematics over fundamental questions about the consistency of axioms and the role of semantics and syntax in mathematics. L. E. J. Brouwer, a proponent of the constructivist school of intuitionism, opposed David Hilbert, a proponent of formalism. Much of the controversy took place while both were involved with Mathematische Annalen, the leading mathematical journal of the time, with Hilbert as editor-in-chief and Brouwer as a member of its editorial board. In 1928, Hilbert had Brouwer removed from the editorial board of Mathematische Annalen.

== Background ==
The controversy started with Hilbert's axiomatization of geometry in the late 1890s. In his biography of Kurt Gödel, John W. Dawson, Jr observed that "partisans of three principal philosophical positions took part in the debate" – these three being the logicists (Gottlob Frege and Bertrand Russell), the formalists (David Hilbert and his colleagues), and the constructivists (Henri Poincaré and Hermann Weyl); within this constructivist school was the radical self-named "intuitionist" L. E. J. Brouwer.

=== History of Intuitionism ===
Brouwer founded the mathematical philosophy of intuitionism as a challenge to the prevailing formalism of David Hilbert and his colleagues, Paul Bernays, Wilhelm Ackermann, John von Neumann, and others. As a variety of constructive mathematics, intuitionism is a philosophy of the foundations of mathematics which rejects the law of excluded middle in mathematical reasoning.

After completing his dissertation, Brouwer decided not to share his philosophy until he had established his career. By 1910, he had published a number of important papers, in particular the fixed-point theorem. Hilbert admired Brouwer and helped him receive a regular academic appointment in 1912 at the University of Amsterdam. After becoming established, Brouwer decided to return to intuitionism. In the later 1920s, Brouwer became involved in a public controversy with Hilbert over editorial policy at Mathematische Annalen, at that time a leading learned journal. He became relatively isolated; the development of intuitionism at its source was taken up by his student Arend Heyting.

=== Origins of disagreement ===
The nature of Hilbert's proof of the Hilbert basis theorem from 1888 was controversial. Although Leopold Kronecker, a constructivist, had conceded, Hilbert would later respond to others' similar criticisms that "many different constructions are subsumed under one fundamental idea" – in other words (to quote Hilbert's biographer Constance Reid): "Through a proof of existence, Hilbert had been able to obtain a construction"; "the proof" (i.e. the symbols on the page) was "the object".

Brouwer was not convinced and, in particular, objected to the use of the law of excluded middle over infinite sets. Hilbert responded: "Taking the Principle of the Excluded Middle from the mathematician... is the same as... prohibiting the boxer the use of his fists."

=== Validity of the law of excluded middle ===
In an address delivered in 1927, Hilbert attempted to defend his axiomatic system as having "important general philosophical significance." Hilbert views his system as having no tacit assumptions admitted, stating, "After all, it is part of the task of science to liberate us from arbitrariness, sentiment and habit and to protect us from the subjectivism that... finds its culmination in intuitionism."

Later in the address, Hilbert deals with the rejection of the law of excluded middle: "Intuitionism's sharpest and most passionate challenge is the one it flings at the validity of the principle of excluded middle..." Rejecting the law of the excluded middle, as extended over Cantor's completed infinite, implied rejecting Hilbert's axiomatic system, in particular his "logical ε-axiom."

Finally, Hilbert singled out Brouwer, by implication rather than name, as the cause of his present tribulation: "I am astonished that a mathematician should doubt that the principle of excluded middle is strictly valid as a mode of inference. I am even more astonished that, as it seems, a whole community of mathematicians who do the same has so constituted itself. I am most astonished by the fact that even in mathematical circles, the power of suggestion of a single man, however full of temperament and inventiveness, is capable of having the most improbable and eccentric effects."

Brouwer responded to this, saying: "Formalism has received nothing but benefactions from intuitionism and may expect further benefactions. The formalistic school should therefore accord some recognition to intuitionism instead of polemicizing against it in sneering tones while not even observing proper mention of authorship."

== Deeper philosophic differences ==
=== Truth of axioms ===
Until Hilbert proposed his formalism, axioms of mathematics were chosen on an intuitive basis in an attempt to use mathematics to find truth. Aristotelian logic is one such example – it seems "logical" that an object either has a stated property (e.g. "This truck is yellow") or it does not have that property ("This truck is not yellow") but not both simultaneously (the Aristotelian Law of Non-Contradiction). The primitive form of the induction axiom is another example: if a predicate P(n) is true for n = 0 and if for all natural numbers n, if P(n) being true implies that P(n+1) is true, then P(n) is true for all natural numbers n.

Hilbert's axiomatic system is different. At the outset it declares its axioms, and any (arbitrary, abstract) collection of axioms is free to be chosen. Weyl criticized Hilbert's formalization, saying it transformed mathematics "from a system of intuitive results into a game with formulas that proceeds according to fixed rules" and asking what might guide the choice of these rules. Weyl concluded "consistency is indeed a necessary but not sufficient condition" and stated "If Hilbert's view prevails over intuitionism, as appears to be the case, then I see in this a decisive defeat of the philosophical attitude of pure phenomenology, which thus proves to be insufficient for the understanding of creative science even in the area of cognition that is most primal and most readily open to evidence – mathematics."

=== The law of excluded middle extended to the infinite ===
Cantor (1897) extended the intuitive notion of "the infinite" – one foot placed after the other in a never-ending march toward the horizon – to the notion of "a completed infinite" – the arrival "all the way, way out there" in one fell swoop, and he symbolized this notion with a single sign ℵ_{0} (aleph-null). Hilbert's adoption of the notion wholesale was "thoughtless", Brouwer alleged. Brouwer in his (1927a) "Intuitionistic reflections on formalism" states: "SECOND INSIGHT The rejection of the thoughtless use of the logical principle of the excluded middle, as well as the recognition, first, of the fact that the investigation of the question why the principle mentioned is justified and to what extent it is valid constitutes an essential object of research in the foundations of mathematics, and, second, of the fact that in intuitive (contentual) mathematics this principle is valid only for finite systems. THIRD INSIGHT. The identification of the principle of excluded middle with the principle of the solvability of every mathematical problem."

This Third Insight is referring to Hilbert's second problem and Hilbert's ongoing attempt to axiomatize all of arithmetic, and with this system, to discover a "consistency proof" for all of mathematics. So into this fray (started by Poincaré) Brouwer plunged head-long, with Weyl as back-up.

Their first complaint (Brouwer's Second Insight, above) arose from Hilbert's extension of Aristotle's "Law of Excluded Middle" (and "double negation") – hitherto restricted to finite domains of Aristotelian discourse – to infinite domains of discourse. In the late 1890s Hilbert axiomatized geometry. Then he went on to use the Cantorian-inspired notion of the completed infinity to produce elegant, radically abbreviated proofs in analysis (1896 and afterwards). In his own words of defense, Hilbert believed himself justified in what he had done (in the following he calls this type of proof an existence proof): "...I stated a general theorem (1896) on algebraic forms that is a pure existence statement and by its very nature cannot be transformed into a statement involving constructibility. Purely by use of this existence theorem I avoided the lengthy and unclear argumentation of Weierstrass and the highly complicated calculations of Dedekind, and in addition, I believe, only my proof uncovers the inner reason for the validity of the assertions adumbrated by Gauss and formulated by Weierstrass and Dedekind." "The value of pure existence proofs consists precisely in that the individual construction is eliminated by them and that many different constructions are subsumed under one fundamental idea, so that only what is essential to the proof stands out clearly; brevity and economy of thought are the raison d'être of existence proofs."

What Hilbert had to give up was "constructibility." His proofs would not produce "objects" (except for the proofs themselves – i.e., symbol strings), but rather they would produce contradictions of the premises and have to proceed by reductio ad absurdum extended over the infinite.

=== Hilbert's quest for a generalized proof of consistency of the axioms of arithmetic ===
Brouwer viewed this loss of constructibility as bad, but worse when applied to a generalized "proof of consistency" for all of mathematics. In his 1900 address Hilbert had specified, as the second of his 23 problems for the twentieth century, the quest for a generalized proof of (procedure for determining) the consistency of the axioms of arithmetic. Hilbert, unlike Brouwer, believed that the formalized notion of mathematical induction could be applied in the search for the generalized consistency proof.

If this proof/procedure P was found, given any arbitrary mathematical theorem T (formula, procedure, proof) put to P (thus P(T)) including P itself (thus P(P)), P would determine conclusively whether or not the theorem T (and P) was provable – i.e. derivable from its premises, the axioms of arithmetic. Thus for all T, T would be provable by P or not provable by P and under all conditions (i.e. for any assignment of numerical values to T's variables). This requires the use of the Law of Excluded Middle extended over the infinite, in fact extended twice – first over all theorems (formulas, procedures, proofs) and secondly for a given theorem, for all assignment of its variables. This point, missed by Hilbert, was first pointed out to him by Poincaré and later by Weyl in his 1927 comments on Hilbert's lecture: "For after all Hilbert, too, is not merely concerned with, say 0' or 0' ', but with any 0'^{...} ', with an arbitrarily concretely given numeral. One may here stress the "concretely given"; on the other hand, it is just as essential that the contentual arguments in proof theory be carried out in hypothetical generality, on any proof, on any numeral. ... It seems to me that Hilbert's proof theory shows Poincaré to have been completely right on this point."

In his discussion preceding Weyl's 1927 comments, van Heijenoort explains that Hilbert insisted that he had addressed the issue of "whether a formula, taken as an axiom, leads to a contradiction, the question is whether a proof that leads to a contradiction can be presented to me".

"But [writes van Heijenoort] in a consistency proof the argument does not deal with one single specific formula; it has to be extended to all formulas. This is the point that Weyl has in mind ... ."

Given such a generalized proof, all mathematics could be replaced by an automaton consisting of two parts: (i) a formula-generator to create formulas one after the other, followed by (ii) the generalized consistency proof, which would yield "Yes – valid (i.e. provable)" or "No – not valid (not provable)" for each formula submitted to it (and every possible assignment of numbers to its variables). In other words: mathematics would cease as a creative enterprise and become a machine.

=== Objections related to the law of the excluded middle and induction ===
In van Heijenoort's commentary preceding Weyl's (1927) "Comments on Hilbert's second lecture on the foundations of mathematics" Poincaré points out to Hilbert (1905) that there are two types of "induction" (1) the intuitive animal-logic foot-following-foot version that gives us a sense that there's always another footstep after the last footstep, and (2) the formal version – e.g. Peano's version: a string of symbols. Poincaré, Weyl, and Brouwer claimed that Hilbert tacitly, and unjustifiably, adopted formal induction as one of his premises. Poincaré (1905) asserted that, by doing this, Hilbert's reasoning became circular. Weyl's (1927) agreement and Brouwer's polemics ultimately forced Hilbert and his disciples Herbrand, Bernays, and Ackermann to reexamine their notion of "induction" – to eschew the assumption of a "totality of all the objects x of an infinite collection" and (intuitionistically) assume that the general argument proceeds one x after another, ad infinitum (van Heijenoort p. 481, footnote a). This is in fact the so-called "induction schema" used in the notion of "recursion" that was still in development at this time (van Heijenoort p. 493). This schema was acceptable to the intuitionists because it had been derived from "the intuition."

To carry this distinction further, Kleene 1952/1977 distinguishes between three types of mathematical induction: (1) the formal induction rule (Peano's axiom); (2) the inductive definition (examples: counting, "proof by induction"); and (3) the definition by induction (recursive definition of number-theoretic functions or predicates). With regards to (3), Kleene considers primitive recursive functions:

"an intuitive theory about a certain class of number theoretic functions and predicates ... In this theory, as in metamathematics, we shall use only finitary methods.

The series of the natural numbers 0, 0', 0'', 0''', ..., or 0, 1, 2, 3, ... we described as the class of the objects generated from one primitive object 0 by means of one primitive operation ' or +1. This constitutes an inductive definition of the class of the natural numbers.

Proof by induction ... corresponds immediately to this mode of generating the numbers. Definition by induction (not to be confused with 'inductive definition' ...) is the analogous method of defining a number-theoretic function φ(y) or predicate P(y). [A number-theoretic function or predicate takes as its variables only a selection from the natural numbers and produces only a single natural number in turn]. First φ(0) or P(0) (the value of the function or predicate for 0 as argument) is given. Then, for any natural number y, φ(y') or P(y') (the next value after that for y) is expressed in terms of y and φ(y) or P(y) (the value of y). ... The two parts of the definition enable us, as we generate any natural number y, at the same time to determine the value φ(y) or P(y)." (p. 217)

=== Echoes of the controversy ===
Brouwer's insistence on "constructibility" in the search for a "consistency proof for arithmetic" resulted in sensitivity to the issue as reflected by the work of Finsler and Gödel. Ultimately Gödel would "numeralize" his formulae; he then used primitive recursion (and its instantiation of the intuitive, constructive form of induction, i.e., counting and step-by-step evaluation) rather than a string of symbols that represent formal induction. Gödel was so sensitive to this issue that he took great pains in his 1931 paper to point out that his Theorem VI (the so-called "First incompleteness theorem") "is constructive;^{45a} that is, the following has been proved in an intuitionistically unobjectionable manner ... ." He then demonstrates what he believes to be the constructive nature of his "generalization formula" 17 Gen r. Footnote 45a reinforces his point.

Gödel's 1931 paper does include the formalist's symbol-version of the Peano Induction Axiom; it is presented as the following formula, where "." is the logical AND, f is the successor-sign, x_{2} is a function, x_{1} is a variable, x_{1}Π designates "for all values of variable x_{1}" and $\supset$ denotes implication:

$$x_2(0).x_1\Pi(x_2(x_1)\supset x_2(fx_1))\supset x_1\Pi(x_2(x_1))$$

He does not appear to use this in the formalist's sense, but there is some contention around this point. Gödel specifies this symbol string in his I.3., i.e., the formalized inductive axiom appears as shown above – yet even this string can be "numeralized" using Gödel's method. On the other hand, he doesn't appear to use this axiom. Rather, his recursion steps through integers assigned to variable k (cf his (2) on page 602). His skeleton-proof of Theorem V, however, "use(s) induction on the degree of φ," and uses "the induction hypothesis." Without a full proof of this, the "induction hypothesis" could be assumed to be the intuitive version, not the symbolic axiom. His recursion simply steps up the degree of the functions, an intuitive act, ad infinitum. Gödel's proofs being intuitionistically satisfactory and infinitary are not incompatible truths, as long as the law of the excluded middle over the completed infinite isn't invoked anywhere in the proofs.

Despite the last-half-twentieth century's continued abstraction of mathematics, the issue has not entirely gone away. A hard look at the premises of Turing's 1936–1937 work led Robin Gandy (1980) to propose his "principles for mechanisms" that have speed of light as a constraint. As another example, Breger (2000) in his "Tacit Knowledge and Mathematical Progress" delves deeply into the matter of "semantics versus syntax" – in his paper Hilbert, Poincaré, Frege, and Weyl duly make their appearances. Breger asserts that axiomatic proofs assume an experienced, thinking mind. Specifically, he claims a mind must come to the argument equipped with prior knowledge of the symbols and their use (the semantics behind the mindless syntax): "Mathematics as a purely formal system of symbols without a human being possessing the know-how for dealing with the symbols is impossible [according to the chemist Polanyi (1969, 195), the ideal of a form of knowledge that is strictly explicit is contradictory because without tacit knowledge all formulas, words, and illustrations would become meaningless]" (brackets in the original, Breger 2000: 229).

== Kleene on Brouwer–Hilbert ==
A serious study of this controversy can be found in Stephen Kleene's Introduction to Metamathematics, particularly in Chapter III: A critique of mathematical reasoning. He discusses §11. The paradoxes, §12. First inferences from the paradoxes [impredicative definitions, Logicism etc.], §13. Intuitionism, §14. Formalism, §15. Formalization of a theory. Kleene takes the debate seriously, and throughout his book he actually builds the two "formal systems" (e.g., on page 119 he discusses logical laws, such as double negation elimination, which are disallowed in the intuitionist system).

== Bibliography ==
- W.S. Anglin 1994, Mathematics: A Concise History and Philosophy, Springer–Verlag, New York. ISBN 0-387-94280-7.
- Herbert Breger, 2000. "Tacit Knowledge and Mathematical Progress", appearing in E. Groshoz and H. Breger (eds.) 2000, The Growth of Mathematical Knowledge, Kluwer Academic Publishers, Dordrecht Netherlands, ISBN 0-7923-6151-2, pages 221–230.
- Martin Davis, 1965. The Undecidable: Basic Papers on Undecidable Propositions, Unsolvable Problems, and Computable Functions, Raven Press, New York, no ISBN. This includes:
  - Emil Post, 1936. "Finite Combinatory Process. Formulation I", with commentary (pages 288ff)
  - Emil Post, 1941 unpublished until 1965. "Absolutely Unsolvable Problems and Relatively Undecidable Propositions: Account of an Anticipation", with commentary, (pages 338ff)
- van Dalen, Dirk (1990). "The war of the frogs and the mice, or the crisis of the Mathematische annalen". The Mathematical Intelligencer. 12 (4): 17–31. doi:10.1007/BF03024028. S2CID 123400249. On the battle for editorial control of the journal Mathematische Annalen between Hilbert and Brouwer, stemming in part from their foundational differences.
- Martin Davis, 2000. The Engines of Logic, W. W. Norton, London, ISBN 0-393-32229-7 pbk. Cf. Chapter Five: "Hilbert to the Rescue" wherein Davis discusses Brouwer and his relationship with Hilbert and Weyl with brief biographical information of Brouwer.
- John W. Dawson, Jr, 1997. Logical Dilemmas: The Life and Work of Kurt Gödel, A. K. Peters, Wellesley, MA, ISBN 1-56881-256-6.
- Robin Gandy, 1980. "Church's Thesis and Principles for Mechanisms", appearing in J. Barwise, H. J. Keisler and K. Kunen, eds., 1980, The Kleene Symposium, North-Holland Publishing Company, pages 123–148.
- Stephen Hawking, 2005. God Created the Integers: The Mathematical Breakthroughs that Changed History: edited, with commentary, by Stephen Hawking, Running Press, Philadelphia, ISBN 978-0-7624-1922-7. Hawking's commentary on, and an excerpt from Cantor's "Contributions to the Founding of the Theory of Transfinite Numbers" appears on pp. 971ff.
- David Hilbert (1927), "The foundations of mathematics" appearing at http://www.marxists.org/reference/subject/philosophy/works/ge/hilbert.htm and apparently derived from Sohotra Sarkar (ed.) 1996, The Emergence of Logical Empiricism: From 1900 to the Vienna Circle, Garland Publishing Inc, [no publisher's location, no ISBN]. Hilbert's famous address wherein he presents and discusses in some depth his formalism axioms, with particular attention paid to double negation and the Law of Excluded Middle and his "e-axiom. [This on-line document contains typographical errors; a better version is van Heijenoort's Hilbert (1927).]
- Stephen Kleene, 1952 with corrections 1971, 10th reprint 1991, Introduction to Metamathematics, North-Holland Publishing Company, Amsterdam Netherlands, ISBN 0-7204-2103-9. Cf. in particular Chapter III: A Critique of Mathematical Reasoning, §13 "Intuitionism" and §14 "Formalism".
- Jean van Heijenoort, 1976 (2nd printing with corrections), From Frege to Gödel: A Source Book in Mathematical Logic, 1879–1931, Harvard University Press, Cambridge, Massachusetts, ISBN 0-674-32449-8 (pbk.). The following papers and commentary are pertinent and offer a brief time-line of publication. (Important further addenda of Gödel's regarding his acceptance of Turing's machines as a formal logical system to replace his system (Peano Axioms + recursion) appear in Martin Davis, The Undecidable):
  - Hilbert (1904). On the foundations of logic and arithmetic, p. 129
  - Brouwer (1923, 1954, 1954a). On the significance of the principle of excluded middle in mathematics, especially in function theory, p. 334
  - Brouwer (1927) . On the domains of definition of functions p. 446
  - Hilbert (1927). The foundations of mathematics p. 464. (Hilbert's famous address).
  - Weyl (1927). Comments on Hilbert's second lecture on the foundations of mathematics p. 480.
  - Bernays (1927). Appendix to Hilbert's lecture "The foundations of mathematics" p. 485
  - Brouwer (1927a). Intuitionistic reflections on formalism p. 490
  - Gödel (1930a, 1931, 1931a). Some metamathematical results on completeness and consistency. On formally undecidable propositions of Principia mathematica and related systems I, and on compleness and consistency p. 592
  - Brouwer (1954, 1954a). Addenda and corrigenda, and Further addenda and corrigenda, p. 334ff
- Ernest Nagel and James Newmann 1958, Gödel's Proof, New York University Press, no ISBN, Library of Congress card catalog number 58-5610.
- Constance Reid 1996. Hilbert, Springer, ISBN 0-387-94674-8. The biography in English.
- Bertrand Russell, originally published 1912, with commentary by John Perry 1997. The Problems of Philosophy, Oxford University Press, New York, New York, ISBN 0-19-511552-X.
