= Finitism =

Philosophy of mathematics that accepts only finite objects

Finitism is a philosophy of mathematics that accepts the existence only of finite mathematical objects. It is best understood in comparison to the mainstream philosophy of mathematics where infinite mathematical objects (e.g., infinite sets) are accepted as existing.

== Main idea ==
The main idea of finitistic mathematics is not accepting the existence of infinite objects such as infinite sets. While all natural numbers are accepted as existing, the set of all natural numbers is not considered to exist as a mathematical object. Therefore quantification over infinite domains is not considered meaningful. The mathematical theory often associated with finitism is Thoralf Skolem's primitive recursive arithmetic.

== History ==
The introduction of infinite mathematical objects occurred a few centuries ago when the use of infinite objects was already a controversial topic among mathematicians. The issue entered a new phase when Georg Cantor in 1874 introduced what is now called naive set theory and used it as a base for his work on transfinite numbers. When paradoxes such as Russell's paradox, Berry's paradox and the Burali-Forti paradox were discovered in Cantor's naive set theory, the issue became a heated topic among mathematicians.

There were various positions taken by mathematicians. All agreed about finite mathematical objects such as natural numbers. However there were disagreements regarding infinite mathematical objects. One position was the intuitionistic mathematics that was advocated by L. E. J. Brouwer, which rejected the existence of infinite objects until they are constructed.

Another position was endorsed by David Hilbert: finite mathematical objects are concrete objects, infinite mathematical objects are ideal objects, and accepting ideal mathematical objects does not cause a problem regarding finite mathematical objects. More formally, Hilbert believed that it is possible to show that any theorem about finite mathematical objects that can be obtained using ideal infinite objects can be also obtained without them. Therefore allowing infinite mathematical objects would not cause a problem regarding finite objects. This led to Hilbert's program of proving both consistency and completeness of set theory using finitistic means as this would imply that adding ideal mathematical objects is conservative over the finitistic part. Hilbert's views are also associated with the formalist philosophy of mathematics. Hilbert's goal of proving the consistency and completeness of set theory or even arithmetic through finitistic means turned out to be an impossible task due to Kurt Gödel's incompleteness theorems. However, Harvey Friedman's grand conjecture would imply that most mathematical results are provable using finitistic means.

Hilbert did not give a rigorous explanation of what he considered finitistic and referred to as elementary. However, based on his work with Paul Bernays some experts such as Tait (1981) have argued that primitive recursive arithmetic can be considered an upper bound on what Hilbert considered finitistic mathematics.

As a result of Gödel's theorems, as it became clear that there is no hope of proving both the consistency and completeness of mathematics, and with the development of seemingly consistent axiomatic set theories such as Zermelo–Fraenkel set theory, most modern mathematicians do not focus on this topic.

== Classical finitism vs. strict finitism ==
In her book The Philosophy of Set Theory, Mary Tiles characterized those who allow potentially infinite objects as classical finitists, and those who do not allow potentially infinite objects as strict finitists: for example, a classical finitist would allow statements such as "every natural number has a successor" and would accept the meaningfulness of infinite series in the sense of limits of finite partial sums, while a strict finitist would not. Historically, the written history of mathematics was thus classically finitist until Cantor created the hierarchy of transfinite cardinals at the end of the 19th century.

== Views regarding infinite mathematical objects ==
Leopold Kronecker remained a strident opponent to Cantor's set theory:

Die ganzen Zahlen hat der liebe Gott gemacht, alles andere ist Menschenwerk. God created the integers; all else is the work of man.

— 1886 lecture at the Berliner Naturforscher-Versammlung

Reuben Goodstein was another proponent of finitism. Some of his work involved building up to analysis from finitist foundations.

Although he denied it, much of Ludwig Wittgenstein's writing on mathematics has a strong affinity with finitism.

If finitists are contrasted with transfinitists (proponents of e.g. Georg Cantor's hierarchy of infinities), then also Aristotle may be characterized as a finitist. Aristotle especially promoted the potential infinity as a middle option between strict finitism and actual infinity (the latter being an actualization of something never-ending in nature, in contrast with the Cantorist actual infinity consisting of the transfinite cardinal and ordinal numbers, which have nothing to do with the things in nature):

But on the other hand to suppose that the infinite does not exist in any way leads obviously to many impossible consequences: there will be a beginning and end of time, a magnitude will not be divisible into magnitudes, number will not be infinite. If, then, in view of the above considerations, neither alternative seems possible, an arbiter must be called in.

— Aristotle, Physics, Book 3, Chapter 6

== Other related philosophies of mathematics ==
Ultrafinitism (also known as ultraintuitionism) has an even more conservative attitude towards mathematical objects than finitism, and has objections to the existence of finite mathematical objects when they are too large.

Towards the end of the 20th century John Penn Mayberry developed a system of finitary mathematics which he called "Euclidean Arithmetic". The most striking tenet of his system is a complete and rigorous rejection of the special foundational status normally accorded to iterative processes, including in particular the construction of the natural numbers by the iteration "+1". Consequently Mayberry is in sharp dissent from those who would seek to equate finitary mathematics with Peano arithmetic or any of its fragments such as primitive recursive arithmetic.

== See also ==
- Constructivism (philosophy of mathematics)
- Intuitionism
- Kripke–Platek set theory#Opposite of infinity
- Rational trigonometry
- Temporal finitism
- Transcomputational problem
