= Constructive logic =

Constructive logic is a family of logics where proofs must be constructive (i.e., proving something means one must build or exhibit it, not just argue it “must exist” abstractly). No “non-constructive” proofs are allowed (like the classic proof by contradiction without a witness).

The main constructive logics are the following:

== 1. Intuitionistic logic ==
Founder: L. E. J. Brouwer (1908, philosophy) formalized by A. Heyting (1930) and A. N. Kolmogorov (1932)

Key Idea: Truth = having a proof. One cannot assert “$P$ or not $P$” unless one can prove $P$ or prove $\neg P$.

Features:

- No law of excluded middle ($P \lor \neg P$ is not generally valid).
- No double negation elimination ($\neg \neg\ P \to P$ is not valid generally).
- Implication is constructive: a proof of $P \to Q$ is a method turning any proof of P into a proof of Q.

Used in: type theory, constructive mathematics.

== 2. Modal logics for constructive reasoning ==
Founder(s):

- K F. Gödel (1933) showed that intuitionistic logic can be embedded into modal logic S4.
- (other systems)

Interpretation (Gödel): $\Box P$ means “$P$ is provable” (or “necessarily $P$” in the proof sense).

Further: Modern provability logics build on this.

== 3. Minimal logic ==
Simpler than intuitionistic logic.

Founder: I. Johansson (1937)

Key Idea: Like intuitionistic logic but without assuming the principle of explosion (ex falso quodlibet, “from falsehood, anything follows”).

Features:

- Doesn’t automatically infer any proposition from a contradiction.

Used for: Studying logics without commitment to contradictions blowing up the system.

== 4. Intuitionistic type theory (Martin-Löf type theory) ==
Founder: P. E. R. Martin-Löf (1970s)

Key Idea: Types = propositions, terms = proofs (this is the Curry–Howard correspondence).

Features:

- Every proof is a program (and vice versa).
- Very strict — everything must be directly constructible.

Used in: Proof assistants like Rocq, Agda.

== 5. Linear logic ==
Not strictly intuitionistic, but very constructive.

Founder: J. Girard (1987)

Key Idea: Resource sensitivity — one can only use an assumption once unless one specifically says it can be reused.

Features:

- Tracks “how many times” one can use a proof.
- Splits conjunction/disjunction into multiple types (e.g., additive vs. multiplicative).

Used in: Computer science, concurrency, quantum logic.

== 6. Other Constructive Systems ==
- Constructive set theory (e.g., CZF — Constructive Zermelo–Fraenkel set theory): Builds sets constructively.
- Realizability Theory: Ties constructive logic to computability — proofs correspond to algorithms.
- Topos Logic: Internal logics of topoi (generalized spaces) are intuitionistic.

== See also ==
- Constructivism (philosophy of mathematics)
