= Pre-intuitionism =

Categorization of some philosophers of mathematics

In the philosophy of mathematics, the pre-intuitionists is the name given by L. E. J. Brouwer to several influential mathematicians who shared similar opinions on the nature of mathematics. The term was introduced by Brouwer in his 1951 lectures at Cambridge where he described the differences between his philosophy of intuitionism and its predecessors:

Of a totally different orientation [from the "Old Formalist School" of Dedekind, Cantor, Peano, Zermelo, and Couturat, etc.] was the Pre-Intuitionist School, mainly led by Poincaré, Borel and Lebesgue. These thinkers seem to have maintained a modified observational standpoint for the introduction of natural numbers, for the principle of complete induction [...] For these, even for such theorems as were deduced by means of classical logic, they postulated an existence and exactness independent of language and logic and regarded its non-contradictority as certain, even without logical proof. For the continuum, however, they seem not to have sought an origin strictly extraneous to language and logic.

== The principle of complete induction ==
This sense of definition allowed Poincaré to argue with Bertrand Russell over Giuseppe Peano's axiomatic theory of natural numbers.

Peano's fifth axiom states:

- Allow that; zero has a property P;
- And; if every natural number less than a number x has the property P then x also has the property P.
- Therefore; every natural number has the property P.

This is the principle of complete induction, which establishes the property of induction as necessary to the system. Since Peano's axiom is as infinite as the natural numbers, it is difficult to prove that the property of P does belong to any x and also x + 1. What one can do is say that, if after some number n of trials that show a property P conserved in x and x + 1, then we may infer that it will still hold to be true after n + 1 trials. But this is itself induction. And hence the argument begs the question.

From this Poincaré argues that if we fail to establish the consistency of Peano's axioms for natural numbers without falling into circularity, then the principle of complete induction is not provable by general logic.

Thus arithmetic and mathematics in general is not analytic but synthetic. Logicism thus rebuked and Intuition is held up. What Poincaré and the Pre-Intuitionists shared was the perception of a difference between logic and mathematics that is not a matter of language alone, but of knowledge itself.

== Arguments over the excluded middle ==
It was for this assertion, among others, that Poincaré was considered to be similar to the intuitionists. For Brouwer though, the Pre-Intuitionists failed to go as far as necessary in divesting mathematics from metaphysics, for they still used principium tertii exclusi (the "law of excluded middle").

The principle of the excluded middle does lead to some strange situations. For instance, statements about the future such as "There will be a naval battle tomorrow" do not seem to be either true or false, yet. So there is some question whether statements must be either true or false in some situations. To an intuitionist this seems to rank the law of excluded middle as just as unrigorous as Peano's vicious circle.

Yet to the Pre-Intuitionists this is mixing apples and oranges. For them mathematics was one thing (a muddled invention of the human mind, i.e., synthetic), and logic was another (analytic).

== Other pre-intuitionists ==
The above examples only include the works of Poincaré, and yet Brouwer named other mathematicians as Pre-Intuitionists too; Borel and Lebesgue. Other mathematicians such as Hermann Weyl (who eventually became disenchanted with intuitionism, feeling that it places excessive strictures on mathematical progress) and Leopold Kronecker also played a role—though they are not cited by Brouwer in his definitive speech.

In fact Kronecker might be the most famous of the Pre-Intuitionists for his singular and oft quoted phrase, "God made the natural numbers; all else is the work of man."

Kronecker goes in almost the opposite direction from Poincaré, believing in the natural numbers but not the law of the excluded middle. He was the first mathematician to express doubt on non-constructive existence proofs that state that something must exist because it can be shown that it is "impossible" for it not to.

== See also ==
- Conventionalism
