= Intuitionism =

Approach in philosophy of mathematics and logic

In philosophy of mathematics, intuitionism, or neointuitionism (opposed to preintuitionism), is an approach where mathematics is considered to be purely the result of the constructive mental activity of humans rather than the discovery of fundamental principles claimed to exist in an objective reality. That is, logic and mathematics are not considered analytic activities wherein deep properties of objective reality are revealed and applied, but are instead considered the application of internally consistent methods used to realize more complex mental constructs, regardless of their possible independent existence in an objective reality.

== Truth and proof ==
The fundamental distinguishing characteristic of intuitionism is its interpretation of what it means for a mathematical statement to be true. In Brouwer's original intuitionism, the truth of a mathematical statement is a subjective claim: a mathematical statement corresponds to a mental construction, and a mathematician can assert the truth of a statement only by verifying the validity of that construction by intuition. The vagueness of the intuitionistic notion of truth often leads to misinterpretations about its meaning. Kleene formally defined intuitionistic truth from a realist position, yet Brouwer would likely reject this formalization as meaningless, given his rejection of the realist/Platonist position. Intuitionistic truth therefore remains somewhat ill-defined. However, because the intuitionistic notion of truth is more restrictive than that of classical mathematics, the intuitionist must reject some assumptions of classical logic to ensure that everything they prove is in fact intuitionistically true. This gives rise to intuitionistic logic.

To an intuitionist, the claim that an object with certain properties exists is a claim that an object with those properties can be constructed. Any mathematical object is considered to be a product of a construction of a mind, and therefore, the existence of an object is equivalent to the possibility of its construction. This contrasts with the classical approach, which states that the existence of an entity can be proved by refuting its nonexistence. For the intuitionist, this is not valid; the refutation of the nonexistence does not mean that it is possible to find a construction for the putative object, as is required in order to assert its existence. As such, intuitionism is a variety of mathematical constructivism; but it is not the only kind.

The interpretation of negation is different in intuitionist logic than in classical logic. In classical logic, the negation of a statement asserts that the statement is false; to an intuitionist, it means the statement is refutable. There is thus an asymmetry between a positive and negative statement in intuitionism. If a statement P is provable, then P certainly cannot be refutable. But even if it can be shown that P cannot be refuted, this does not constitute a proof of P. Thus P is a stronger statement than not-not-P.

Similarly, to assert that A or B holds, to an intuitionist, is to claim that either A or B can be proved. In particular, the law of excluded middle, "A or not A", is not accepted as a valid principle. For example, if A is some mathematical statement that an intuitionist has not yet proved or disproved, then that intuitionist will not assert the truth of "A or not A". However, the intuitionist will accept that "A and not A" cannot be true. Thus the connectives "and" and "or" of intuitionistic logic do not satisfy de Morgan's laws as they do in classical logic.

Intuitionistic logic substitutes constructability for abstract truth and is associated with a transition from the proof of model theory to abstract truth in modern mathematics. The logical calculus preserves justification, rather than truth, across transformations yielding derived propositions. It has been taken as giving philosophical support to several schools of philosophy, most notably the Anti-realism of Michael Dummett. Thus, contrary to the first impression its name might convey, and as realized in specific approaches and disciplines (e.g. Fuzzy Sets and Systems), intuitionist mathematics is more rigorous than conventionally founded mathematics, where, ironically, the foundational elements which intuitionism attempts to construct/refute/refound are taken as intuitively given.

== Infinity ==
Among the different formulations of intuitionism, there are several different positions on the meaning and reality of infinity.

The term potential infinity refers to a mathematical procedure in which there is an unending series of steps. After each step has been completed, there is always another step to be performed. For example, consider the process of counting: $1, 2, ...$

The term actual infinity refers to a completed mathematical object which contains an infinite number of elements. An example is the set of natural numbers, $\mathbb{N} = \{1, 2, ...\}$.

In Cantor's formulation of set theory, there are many different infinite sets, some of which are larger than others. For example, the set of all real numbers $\mathbb{R}$ is larger than $\mathbb{N}$, because any attempt to put the natural numbers into one-to-one correspondence with the real numbers will always fail: there will always be an infinite number of real numbers "left over". Any infinite set that can be placed in one-to-one correspondence with the natural numbers is said to be "countable" or "denumerable". Infinite sets larger than this are said to be "uncountable".

Cantor's set theory led to the axiomatic system of Zermelo–Fraenkel set theory (ZFC), now the most common foundation of modern mathematics. Intuitionism was created, in part, as a reaction to Cantor's set theory.

Modern constructive set theory includes the axiom of infinity from ZFC (or a revised version of this axiom) and the set $\mathbb{N}$ of natural numbers. Most modern constructive mathematicians accept the reality of countably infinite sets (however, see Alexander Esenin-Volpin for a counter-example).

Brouwer rejected the concept of actual infinity, but admitted the idea of potential infinity.

According to Weyl 1946, 'Brouwer made it clear, as I think beyond any doubt, that there is no evidence supporting the belief in the existential character of the totality of all natural numbers ... the sequence of numbers which grows beyond any stage already reached by passing to the next number, is a manifold of possibilities open towards infinity; it remains forever in the status of creation, but is not a closed realm of things existing in themselves. That we blindly converted one into the other is the true source of our difficulties, including the antinomies – a source of more fundamental nature than Russell's vicious circle principle indicated. Brouwer opened our eyes and made us see how far classical mathematics, nourished by a belief in the 'absolute' that transcends all human possibilities of realization, goes beyond such statements as can claim real meaning and truth founded on evidence.

— Kleene 1991, pp. 48–49

== History ==
Intuitionism's history can be traced to two controversies in nineteenth century mathematics.

The first of these was the invention of transfinite arithmetic by Georg Cantor and its subsequent rejection by a number of prominent mathematicians including most famously his teacher Leopold Kronecker—a confirmed finitist.

The second of these was Gottlob Frege's effort to reduce all of mathematics to a logical formulation via set theory and its derailing by a youthful Bertrand Russell, the discoverer of Russell's paradox. Frege had planned a three-volume definitive work, but just as the second volume was going to press, Russell sent Frege a letter outlining his paradox, which demonstrated that one of Frege's rules of self-reference was self-contradictory. In an appendix to the second volume, Frege acknowledged that one of the axioms of his system did in fact lead to Russell's paradox. (Note: See Frege 1960, pp. 234–244)

Frege, the story goes, plunged into depression and did not publish the third volume of his work as he had planned. For more see Davis (2000) Chapters 3 and 4: Frege: From Breakthrough to Despair and Cantor: Detour through Infinity. See van Heijenoort for the original works and van Heijenoort's commentary.

These controversies are strongly linked as the logical methods used by Cantor in proving his results in transfinite arithmetic are essentially the same as those used by Russell in constructing his paradox. Hence how one chooses to resolve Russell's paradox has direct implications on the status accorded to Cantor's transfinite arithmetic.

In the early twentieth century L. E. J. Brouwer represented the intuitionist position and David Hilbert the formalist position—see van Heijenoort. Kurt Gödel offered opinions referred to as Platonist (see various sources re Gödel). Alan Turing considers: "non-constructive systems of logic with which not all the steps in a proof are mechanical, some being intuitive". Later, Stephen Cole Kleene brought forth a more rational consideration of intuitionism in his Introduction to metamathematics (1952).

Nicolas Gisin is adopting intuitionist mathematics to reinterpret quantum indeterminacy, information theory and the physics of time.

== Contributors ==
- Henri Poincaré (preintuitionism/conventionalism)
- L. E. J. Brouwer
- Michael Dummett
- Arend Heyting
- Stephen Kleene

== Branches of intuitionistic mathematics ==
- Intuitionistic logic
- Intuitionistic arithmetic
- Intuitionistic type theory
- Intuitionistic set theory
- Intuitionistic analysis

== See also ==
- Anti-realism
- BHK interpretation
- Brouwer–Hilbert controversy
- Computability logic
- Conceptualism
- Constructive logic
- Constructivism (philosophy of mathematics)
- Curry–Howard isomorphism
- Finitism
- Foundations of mathematics
- Fuzzy logic
- Game semantics
- Intuition (knowledge)
- Model theory
- Topos theory
- Ultraintuitionism
