= Ultrafinitism =

Concept in the philosophy of mathematics

In the philosophy of mathematics, ultrafinitism, ultraintuitionism, strict formalism, strict finitism, actualism, predicativism, and strong finitism are various philosophies of mathematics with aspects of finitism and intuitionism. Common to these philosophies is their objection to the totality of number theoretic functions like exponentiation over natural numbers.

== Main ideas ==
Like other finitists, ultrafinitists deny the existence of the infinite set $\N$ of natural numbers, on the basis that it can never be completed.

In addition, some ultrafinitists are concerned with acceptance of objects in mathematics that no one can construct in practice because of physical restrictions in constructing large finite mathematical objects. Thus some ultrafinitists will deny or refrain from accepting the existence of large numbers, for example, the floor of the first Skewes's number, which is a huge number defined using the exponential function as exp(exp(exp(79))), or

$$e^{e^{e^{79}}}.$$

The reason is that nobody has yet calculated what natural number is the floor of this real number, and it may not even be physically possible to do so. Similarly, $2\uparrow\uparrow\uparrow 6$ (in Knuth's up-arrow notation) would be considered only a formal expression that does not correspond to a natural number. The brand of ultrafinitism concerned with physical realizability of mathematics is often called actualism.

Edward Nelson criticized the classical conception of natural numbers because of the circularity of its definition. In classical mathematics the natural numbers are defined as 0 and numbers obtained by the iterative applications of the successor function to 0. But the concept of natural number is already assumed for the iteration. In other words, to obtain a number like $2\uparrow\uparrow\uparrow 6$ one needs to perform the successor function iteratively (in fact, exactly $2\uparrow\uparrow\uparrow 6$ times) to 0.

Some versions of ultrafinitism are forms of constructivism, but most constructivists view the philosophy as unworkably extreme. The logical foundation of ultrafinitism is unclear; in his comprehensive survey Constructivism in Mathematics (1988), the constructive logician A. S. Troelstra dismissed it by saying "no satisfactory development exists at present." This was not so much a philosophical objection as it was an admission that, in a rigorous work of mathematical logic, there was simply nothing precise enough to include.

== People associated with ultrafinitism ==
Serious work on ultrafinitism was led, from 1959 until his death in 2016, by Alexander Esenin-Volpin, who in 1961 sketched a program for proving the consistency of Zermelo–Fraenkel set theory in ultrafinite mathematics. Other mathematicians who have worked in the topic include Doron Zeilberger, Edward Nelson, Rohit Jivanlal Parikh, and Jean Paul Van Bendegem. The philosophy is also sometimes associated with the beliefs of Ludwig Wittgenstein, Robin Gandy, Petr Vopěnka, and Johannes Hjelmslev.

Shaughan Lavine has developed a form of set-theoretical ultrafinitism that is consistent with classical mathematics. Lavine has shown that the basic principles of arithmetic such as "there is no largest natural number" can be upheld, as Lavine allows for the inclusion of "indefinitely large" numbers.

== Computational complexity theory based restrictions ==
Other considerations of the possibility of avoiding unwieldy large numbers can be based on computational complexity theory, as in András Kornai's work on explicit finitism (which does not deny the existence of large numbers) and Vladimir Sazonov's notion of feasible numbers.

There has also been considerable formal development on versions of ultrafinitism that are based on complexity theory, like Samuel Buss's bounded arithmetic theories, which capture mathematics associated with various complexity classes like P and PSPACE. Buss's work can be considered the continuation of Edward Nelson's work on predicative arithmetic as bounded arithmetic theories like S12 are interpretable in Raphael Robinson's theory Q and therefore are predicative in Nelson's sense. The power of these theories for developing mathematics is studied in bounded reverse mathematics as can be found in the works of Stephen A. Cook and Phuong The Nguyen. However these are not philosophies of mathematics but rather the study of restricted forms of reasoning similar to reverse mathematics.

== See also ==
- Finitism
- Internal set theory — An enrichment of ZFC which has theorems such as "there exists a largest standard natural number". Developed by ultrafinitist Edward Nelson.
- Transcomputational problem
