= Dirk van Dalen =

Dutch mathematician and historian of science

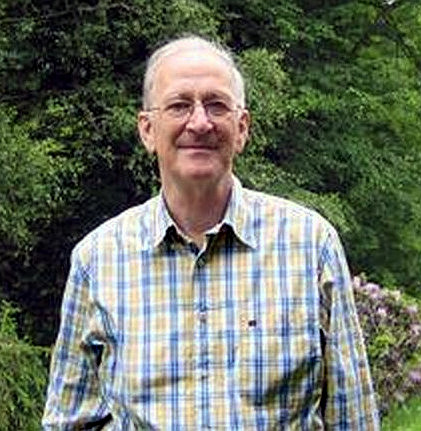
Dirk van Dalen

Dirk van Dalen (born 20 December 1932, Amsterdam) is a Dutch mathematician and historian of science.

== Life ==
Van Dalen studied mathematics and physics and astronomy at the University of Amsterdam. Inspired by the work of Brouwer and Heyting, he received his Ph.D. in 1963 from the University of Amsterdam for the thesis Extension problems in intuitionistic plane Projective geometry. From 1964 to 1966 Van Dalen taught logic and mathematics at MIT, and later Oxford. From 1967 he was professor at the University of Utrecht. In 2003 Dirk van Dalen was awarded the Academy Medal 2003 of the Royal Dutch Academy of Sciences for bringing the works of Brouwer to international attention.

== Works ==
=== As (co-)author ===
- Fraenkel, Abraham; Bar-Hillel, Yehoshua; Levy, Azriel; — (1973) [1958]. Foundations of Set Theory. Studies in Logic and Foundations of Mathematics. Vol. 67 (2nd revised ed.). Amsterdam: North Holland Publishing. ISBN 9780080887050.
- — (1963). Extension problems in intuitionistic plane projective geometry (Thesis).
- —; Monna, Antonie Frans (1972). Sets and Integration. An Outline of the Development. Groningen: Wolters-Noordhoff. doi:10.1007/978-94-010-2718-2. ISBN 90-01-59775-0.
- —; Doets, H.C.; De Swart, H.C.M. (1975). Verzamelingen - naïef, axiomatisch en toegepast (in Dutch). Utrecht: Oosthoek, Scheltema & Holkema. p. 364. ISBN 9789031300587.
- —; Doets, H.C.; De Swart, H.C.M. (1978) [1975]. Sets: Naive, Axiomatic and Applied. Pergamon Press. ISBN 0-08-021166-6.
- — (1978). Filosofische grondslagen van de Wiskunde. Terreinverkenningen in de filosofie (in Dutch). Vol. 4. Assen: Van Gorcum. ISBN 90-232-1540-0.
- — (2013) [1980]. Logic and Structure. Universitext (5 ed.). London, Heidelberg, New York, Dordrecht: Springer. doi:10.1007/978-1-4471-4558-5. ISBN 978-1447145578.
- — (1982). "Braucht die konstruktive Mathematik Grundlagen?". Jahresbericht der Deutschen Mathematiker-Vereinigung (in German). 84. Berlin: G. Reimer: 57–78. ISSN 0012-0456.
- Troelstra, Anne Sjerp; — (1988). Constructivism in Mathematics: An Introduction. Amsterdam: North-Holland Publishing.
1. Volume 1. Studies in Logic and the Foundations of Mathematics; 121. 15 July 1988. ISBN 0-444-70266-0.
2. Volume 2. Studies in Logic and the Foundations of Mathematics; 123. 1988. ISBN 0-444-70358-6.
- — (1990). "'The War of the Frogs and the Mice, or the Crisis of the Mathematische Annalen". Mathematical Intelligencer. 12 (4). Springer Verlag: 17–31. doi:10.1007/BF03024028. ISSN 0343-6993. S2CID 123400249.
- —; Ebbinghaus, Heinz-Dieter (June 2000). "Zermelo and the Skolem Paradox". Bulletin of Symbolic Logic. 6 (2): 145–161. doi:10.2307/421203. hdl:1874/27769. JSTOR 421203. S2CID 8530810.
- — (2001). "Intuitionistic Logic". In Goble, Lou (ed.). The Blackwell Guide to Philosophical Logic. New York: Blackwell Publishing. pp. 224–257. doi:10.1002/9781405164801.ch11. ISBN 9780631206934.
- — (2002). L.E.J. Brouwer (1881-1966). Een Biografie. Het heldere licht der wiskunde (in Dutch). Amsterdam: Bert Bakker. p. 561. ISBN 9789035124820.
- —. Mystic, Geometer and Intuitionist. The life of L. E. J. Brouwer. London: Oxford University Press.
1. Dalen, Dirk (2002) [1999]. The dawning revolution. Clarendon Press. ISBN 0-19-850297-4.
2. Dalen, Dirk van (2005). Hope and desillusion. Clarendon Press. ISBN 978-0-19-851620-0.
- — (2005). L.E.J. Brouwer en de Grondslagen van de Wiskunde (in Dutch). Utrecht: Epsilon. p. 209. ISBN 9789050410939.
- — (20 June 2011). "Brouwer's ϵ-fixed point and Sperner's lemma". Theoretical Computer Science. 412 (28): 3140–3144. doi:10.1016/j.tcs.2011.04.002.
- — (2013). L.E.J. Brouwer - Topologist, Intuitionist, Philosopher: How mathematics is rooted in life. Springer Verlag. ISBN 9781447146155.

=== As (co-)editor ===
- —, ed. (1981). Brouwer's Cambridge Lectures on Intuitionism. Cambridge University Press. ISBN 0521234417.
- Freudenthal, Hans (2009). Springer, Tonny A.; — (eds.). Selecta (Heritage of European Mathematics). Sources and studies in the history of mathematics and physical sciences. Zürich: European Mathematical Society. ISBN 978-3-03-719058-6.
- —, ed. (2011). The selected correspondence of L. E. J. Brouwer. Sources and studies in the history of mathematics and physical sciences. London: Springer Verlag. ISBN 978-0-85729-527-9.
