= Brouwer–Heyting–Kolmogorov interpretation =

Interpretation of intuitionistic logic

In mathematical logic, the Brouwer–Heyting–Kolmogorov interpretation, or BHK interpretation, is an explanation of the meaning of proof in intuitionistic logic, proposed by L. E. J. Brouwer and Arend Heyting, and independently by Andrey Kolmogorov. It is also sometimes called the realizability interpretation, because of the connection with the realizability theory of Stephen Kleene. It is the standard explanation of intuitionistic logic.

== The interpretation ==
The interpretation states what is intended to be a proof of a given formula. This is specified by induction on the structure of that formula:

- A proof of $P \wedge Q$ is a pair $\langle a, b \rangle$ where $a$ is a proof of $P$ and $b$ is a proof of $Q$.
- A proof of $P \vee Q$ is either $\langle 0, a \rangle$ where $a$ is a proof of $P$ or $\langle 1, b\rangle$ where $b$ is a proof of $Q$.
- A proof of $P \to Q$ is a construction (see § Definition of construction) that converts a (hypothetical) proof of $P$ into a proof of $Q$.
- A proof of $(\exists x {\in} S) (Px)$ is a pair $\langle x, a \rangle$ where $x$ is an element of $S$ and $a$ is a proof of $Px$.
- A proof of $(\forall x {\in} S) (Px)$ is a construction that converts an element $x$ of $S$ into a proof of $Px$.
- The formula $\neg P$ is defined as $P \to \bot$, so a proof of it is a construction that converts a proof of $P$ into a proof of $\bot$.
- There is no proof of $\bot$, the absurdity.

It may be possible to prove $P \to Q$ even though there are no proofs of $P$ (or proofs of $Q$); $P \to Q$ is the hypothetical assertion that a proof of $Q$ could be built out of a proof of $P$, if one were available.

Kolmogorov followed the same lines but phrased his interpretation in terms of problems and solutions. To assert a formula is to claim to know a solution to the problem represented by that formula. For instance $P \to Q$ is the problem of reducing $Q$ to $P$; to solve it requires a method to solve problem $Q$ given a solution to problem $P$.

The interpretation of a primitive proposition is supposed to be known from context. In the context of arithmetic, a proof of the formula $x = y$ is a computation reducing the two terms to the same numeral.

== Definition of construction ==
The BHK interpretation will depend on the view taken about what constitutes a construction that converts one proof to another, or that converts an element of a domain to a proof. Different versions of constructivism will diverge on this point.

Kleene's realizability theory identifies constructions with the computable functions. It deals with Heyting arithmetic, where the domain of quantification is the natural numbers and the primitive propositions are of the form x = y. A proof of x = y is simply the trivial algorithm if x evaluates to the same number that y does (which is always decidable for natural numbers), otherwise there is no proof. These are then built up by induction into more complex algorithms.

If one takes lambda calculus as defining the notion of a construction, then the BHK interpretation describes the correspondence between natural deduction and lambda functions.

== Definition of absurdity ==
It is not, in general, possible for a classical or intuitionistic logical system to have a formal negation operator such that there is a proof of "not" $P$ exactly when there isn't a proof of $P$, as shown by Gödel's incompleteness theorems. The BHK interpretation instead takes "not" $P$ to mean that $P$ leads to absurdity, designated $\bot$, so that a proof of $\lnot P$ is a construction converting a proof of $P$ into a proof of absurdity.

A standard example of absurdity is found in dealing with arithmetic. Assume that 0 = 1, and proceed by mathematical induction: 0 = 0 by the axiom of equality. Now (induction hypothesis), if 0 were equal to a certain natural number n, then 1 would be equal to n + 1, (Peano axiom: Sm = Sn if and only if m = n), but since 0 = 1, therefore 0 would also be equal to n + 1. By induction, 0 is equal to all numbers, and therefore any two natural numbers become equal.

Therefore, there is a way to go from a proof of 0 = 1 to a proof of any basic arithmetic equality, and thus to a proof of any complex arithmetic proposition. Furthermore, to get this result it was not necessary to invoke the Peano axiom that states that 0 is "not" the successor of any natural number. This makes 0 = 1 suitable as $\bot$ in Heyting arithmetic (and the Peano axiom is rewritten 0 = Sn → 0 = S0). This use of 0 = 1 validates the principle of explosion.

== Examples ==
The identity function is a proof of the formula $P \to P$, no matter what P is.

The law of non-contradiction $\neg (P \wedge \neg P)$ expands to $(P \wedge (P \to \bot)) \to \bot$:

- A proof of $(P \wedge (P \to \bot)) \to \bot$ is a construction that converts a proof of $(P \wedge (P \to \bot))$ into a proof of $\bot$.
- A proof of $(P \wedge (P \to \bot))$ is a pair of proofs $\langle a, b \rangle$, where $a$ is a proof of P, and $b$ is a proof of $P \to \bot$.
- A proof of $P \to \bot$ is a construction that converts a proof of $P$ into a proof of $\bot$.

Putting it all together, a proof of $(P \wedge (P \to \bot)) \to \bot$ is a construction that converts a pair $\langle a, b \rangle$ – where $a$ is a proof of $P$, and $b$ is a construction that converts a proof of $P$ into a proof of $\bot$ – into a proof of $\bot$. There is a function $f$ that does this, where $f(\langle a, b \rangle) = b(a)$, proving the law of non-contradiction, no matter what P is.

Indeed, the same line of thought provides a proof for the modus ponens rule $(P \wedge (P \to Q)) \to Q$ as well, where $Q$ is any proposition.

On the other hand, the law of excluded middle $P \vee (\neg P)$ expands to $P \vee (P \to \bot)$, and in general has no proof. According to the interpretation, a proof of $P \vee (\neg P)$ is a pair $\langle a, b \rangle$ where a is 0 and b is a proof of $P$, or a is 1 and b is a proof of $P \to \bot$. Thus if neither $P$ nor $P \to \bot$ is provable then neither is $P \vee (\neg P)$.

== See also ==
- Curry–Howard correspondence
- Logics for computability
