= Hilbert's program =

Attempt to formalize all of mathematics, based on a finite set of axioms

In mathematics, Hilbert's program, formulated by German mathematician David Hilbert in the early 1920s, was a proposed solution to the foundational crisis of mathematics, when early attempts to clarify the foundations of mathematics were found to suffer from paradoxes and inconsistencies. As a solution, Hilbert proposed to ground all existing theories to a finite, complete set of axioms, and provide a proof that these axioms were consistent. Hilbert proposed that the consistency of more complicated systems, such as real analysis, could be proven in terms of simpler systems. Ultimately, the consistency of all of mathematics could be reduced to basic arithmetic.

Gödel's incompleteness theorems, published in 1931, showed that Hilbert's program was unattainable for key areas of mathematics. In his first theorem, Gödel showed that any consistent system with a computable set of axioms which is capable of expressing arithmetic can never be complete: it is possible to construct a statement that can be shown to be true, but that cannot be derived from the formal rules of the system. In his second theorem, he showed that such a system could not prove its own consistency, so it certainly cannot be used to prove the consistency of anything stronger with certainty. This refuted Hilbert's assumption that a finitistic system could be used to prove the consistency of itself, and therefore anything else.

== Statement of Hilbert's program ==
The main goal of Hilbert's program was to provide secure foundations for all mathematics. In particular, this should include:

- A formulation of all mathematics; in other words all mathematical statements should be written in a precise formal language, and manipulated according to well defined rules.
- Completeness: a proof that all true mathematical statements can be proved in the formalism.
- Consistency: a proof that no contradiction can be obtained in the formalism of mathematics. This consistency proof should preferably use only "finitistic" reasoning about finite mathematical objects.
- Conservation: a proof that any result about "real objects" obtained using reasoning about "ideal objects" (such as uncountable sets) can be proved without using ideal objects.
- Decidability: there should be an algorithm for deciding the truth or falsity of any mathematical statement.

== Gödel's incompleteness theorems ==
Kurt Gödel showed that most of the goals of Hilbert's program were impossible to achieve, at least if interpreted in the most obvious way. Gödel's second incompleteness theorem shows that any consistent theory powerful enough to encode addition and multiplication of integers cannot prove its own consistency. This presents a challenge to Hilbert's program:

- It is not possible to formalize all mathematical true statements within a formal system, as any attempt at such a formalism will omit some true mathematical statements. There is no complete, consistent extension of even Peano arithmetic based on a computably enumerable set of axioms.
- A theory such as Peano arithmetic cannot even prove its own consistency, so a restricted "finitistic" subset of it certainly cannot prove the consistency of more powerful theories such as set theory.
- There is no algorithm to decide the truth (or provability) of statements in any consistent extension of Peano arithmetic. Strictly speaking, this negative solution to the Entscheidungsproblem appeared a few years after Gödel's theorem, because at the time the notion of an algorithm had not been precisely defined.

== Hilbert's program after Gödel ==
Many current lines of research in mathematical logic, such as proof theory and reverse mathematics, can be viewed as natural continuations of Hilbert's original program. Much of it can be salvaged by changing its goals slightly (Zach 2005), and with the following modifications some of it was successfully completed:

- Although it is not possible to formalize all mathematics, it is possible to formalize essentially all the mathematics that anyone uses. In particular Zermelo–Fraenkel set theory, combined with first-order logic, gives a satisfactory and generally accepted formalism for almost all current mathematics.
- Although it is not possible to prove completeness for systems that can express at least the Peano arithmetic (or, more generally, that have a computable set of axioms), it is possible to prove forms of completeness for many other interesting systems. An example of a non-trivial theory for which completeness has been proved is the theory of algebraically closed fields of given characteristic.
- The question of whether there are finitary consistency proofs of strong theories is difficult to answer, mainly because there is no generally accepted definition of a "finitary proof". Most mathematicians in proof theory seem to regard finitary mathematics as being contained in Peano arithmetic, and in this case it is not possible to give finitary proofs of reasonably strong theories. On the other hand, Gödel himself suggested the possibility of giving finitary consistency proofs using finitary methods that cannot be formalized in Peano arithmetic, so he seems to have had a more liberal view of what finitary methods might be allowed. A few years later, Gentzen gave a consistency proof for Peano arithmetic. The only part of this proof that was not clearly finitary was a certain transfinite induction up to the ordinal ε_{0}. If this transfinite induction is accepted as a finitary method, then one can assert that there is a finitary proof of the consistency of Peano arithmetic. More powerful subsets of second-order arithmetic have been given consistency proofs by Gaisi Takeuti and others, and one can again debate about exactly how finitary or constructive these proofs are. (The theories that have been proved consistent by these methods are quite strong, and include most "ordinary" mathematics.)
- Although there is no algorithm for deciding the truth of statements in Peano arithmetic, there are many interesting and non-trivial theories for which such algorithms have been found. For example, Tarski found an algorithm that can decide the truth of any statement in analytic geometry (more precisely, he proved that the theory of real closed fields is decidable). Given the Cantor–Dedekind axiom, this algorithm can be regarded as an algorithm to decide the truth of any statement in Euclidean geometry. This is substantial as few people would consider Euclidean geometry a trivial theory.

== See also ==
- Grundlagen der Mathematik
- Foundational crisis of mathematics
