= Actual and potential infinity =

Concept in the philosophy of mathematics

In the philosophy of mathematics, the abstraction of actual infinity, also called completed infinity, involves infinite entities as given, actual and completed objects. Actual infinity is to be contrasted with potential infinity, in which an endless process (such as "add 1 to the previous number") produces a sequence with no last element, and where each individual result is finite and is achieved in a finite number of steps. This type of process occurs in mathematics, for instance, in standard formalizations of the notions of mathematical induction, infinite series, infinite products, and limits.

The concept of actual infinity was introduced into mathematics near the end of the 19th century by Georg Cantor with his theory of infinite sets, and was later formalized into Zermelo–Fraenkel set theory. This theory, which is presently commonly accepted as a foundation of mathematics, contains the axiom of infinity, which means that the natural numbers form a set (necessarily infinite). A great discovery of Cantor is that, if one accepts infinite sets, then there are different sizes (cardinalities) of infinite sets, and, in particular, the cardinal of the continuum of the real numbers is strictly larger than the cardinal of the natural numbers.

== Anaximander ==
The ancient Greek term for the potential or improper infinite was apeiron (unlimited or indefinite), in contrast to the actual or proper infinite aphorismenon. Apeiron stands opposed to that which has a peras (limit). These notions are today denoted by potentially infinite and actually infinite, respectively.

Anaximander (610–546 BC) held that the apeiron was the principle or main element composing all things. Clearly, the 'apeiron' was some sort of basic substance. Plato's notion of the apeiron is more abstract, having to do with indefinite variability. The main dialogues where Plato discusses the 'apeiron' are the late dialogues Parmenides and the Philebus.

== Aristotle ==
Aristotle sums up the views of his predecessors on infinity as follows:

"Only the Pythagoreans place the infinite among the objects of sense (they do not regard number as separable from these), and assert that what is outside the heaven is infinite. Plato, on the other hand, holds that there is no body outside (the Forms are not outside because they are nowhere), yet that the infinite is present not only in the objects of sense but in the Forms also." (Aristotle)

The theme was brought forward by Aristotle's consideration of the apeiron—in the context of mathematics and physics (the study of nature):

"Infinity turns out to be the opposite of what people say it is. It is not 'that which has nothing beyond itself' that is infinite, but 'that which always has something beyond itself'." (Aristotle)

Belief in the existence of the infinite comes mainly from five considerations:

1. From the nature of time – for it is infinite.
2. From the division of magnitudes – for the mathematicians also use the notion of the infinite.
3. If coming to be and passing away do not give out, it is only because that from which things come to be is infinite.
4. Because the limited always finds its limit in something, so that there must be no limit, if everything is always limited by something different from itself.
5. Most of all, a reason which is peculiarly appropriate and presents the difficulty that is felt by everybody – not only number but also mathematical magnitudes and what is outside the heaven are supposed to be infinite because they never give out in our thought. (Aristotle)

Aristotle postulated that an actual infinity was impossible, because if it were possible, then something would have attained infinite magnitude, and would be "bigger than the heavens." However, he said, mathematics relating to infinity was not deprived of its applicability by this impossibility, because mathematicians did not need the infinite for their theorems, just a finite, arbitrarily large magnitude.

=== Aristotle's potential–actual distinction ===
Aristotle handled the topic of infinity in Physics and in Metaphysics. He distinguished between actual and potential infinity. Actual infinity is completed and definite, and consists of infinitely many elements. Potential infinity is never complete: elements can be always added, but never infinitely many. Plato had previously postulated both the Great and the Small infinities. Aristotle uses the examples of addition and division; a potentially infinite sequence of additions or divisions might start, but the processes can never be completed or exhausted. This means that it "exists potentially, but not that the infinite exists separately." Aristotle also argued that Greek mathematicians knew the difference, but did not need or use the actual.

== Scholastic, Renaissance and Enlightenment thinkers ==
The overwhelming majority of scholastic philosophers adhered to the motto Infinitum actu non datur. This means there is only a (developing, improper, "syncategorematic") potential infinity but not a (fixed, proper, "categorematic") actual infinity. There were exceptions, however, for example in England. Georg Cantor wrote that It is well known that in the Middle Ages all scholastic philosophers advocate Aristotle's "infinitum actu non datur" as an irrefutable principle. John Baconthorpe wrote that actual infinity exists "in number, time and quantity"

During the Renaissance and by early modern times, the voices in favor of actual infinity were rather rare, though Gottfried Wilhelm Leibniz expressed favor. Galileo Galilei wrote that "The continuum actually consists of infinitely many indivisibles" However, the majority of pre-modern thinkers agreed with the well-known quote of Gauss:

I protest against the use of infinite magnitude as something completed, which is never permissible in mathematics. Infinity is merely a way of speaking, the true meaning being a limit which certain ratios approach indefinitely close, while others are permitted to increase without restriction. (C.F. Gauss [in a letter to Schumacher, 12 July 1831])

== Modern era ==
Actual infinity is now commonly accepted in mathematics. This drastic change was initialized by Bolzano and Cantor in the 19th century, and was one of the origins of the foundational crisis of mathematics.

Bernard Bolzano, who introduced the notion of set (in German: Menge), and Georg Cantor, who introduced set theory, opposed the general attitude. Cantor distinguished three realms of infinity: (1) the infinity of God (which he called the "absolutum"), (2) the infinity of reality (which he called "nature") and (3) the transfinite numbers and sets of mathematics.

A multitude which is larger than any finite multitude, i.e., a multitude with the property that every finite set [of members of the kind in question] is only a part of it, I will call an infinite multitude. (B. Bolzano [2, p. 6])

Accordingly I distinguish an eternal uncreated infinity or absolutum, which is due to God and his attributes, and a created infinity or transfinitum, which has to be used wherever in the created nature an actual infinity has to be noticed, for example, with respect to, according to my firm conviction, the actually infinite number of created individuals, in the universe as well as on our earth and, most probably, even in every arbitrarily small extended piece of space. (Georg Cantor) (G. Cantor [8, p. 252])

The numbers are a free creation of human mind. (R. Dedekind [3a, p. III])

One proof is based on the notion of God. First, from the highest perfection of God, we infer the possibility of the creation of the transfinite, then, from his all-grace and splendor, we infer the necessity that the creation of the transfinite in fact has happened. (G. Cantor [3, p. 400])

Cantor distinguished two types of actual infinity, the transfinite and the absolute, about which he affirmed:

These concepts are to be strictly differentiated, insofar the former is, to be sure, infinite, yet capable of increase, whereas the latter is incapable of increase and is therefore indeterminable as a mathematical concept. This mistake we find, for example, in Pantheism. (G. Cantor, Über verschiedene Standpunkte in bezug auf das aktuelle Unendliche, in Gesammelte Abhandlungen mathematischen und philosophischen Inhalts, pp. 375, 378)

== Current mathematical practice ==
Actual infinity is now commonly accepted in mathematics under the name "infinite sets". Indeed, set theory has been formalized, for example, as the Zermelo–Fraenkel set theory (ZF). One of the axioms of ZF is the axiom of infinity, that essentially says that the natural numbers form a set.

All mathematics has been rewritten in terms of ZF. In particular, lines, curves, all sort of spaces are commonly defined as the sets of their points. Infinite sets are so common that when one considers finite sets, this is generally explicitly stated, for example in finite geometry or finite fields.

Fermat's Last Theorem is a theorem that was stated in terms of elementary arithmetic, which was proved more than 350 years later. The original Wiles's proof of Fermat's Last Theorem, used not only the full power of ZF with the axiom of choice, but used implicitly a further axiom that implies the existence of very large sets. The requirement of this further axiom has been later dismissed, but infinite sets remain used in a fundamental way. This was not an obstacle for the recognition of the correctness of the proof by the community of mathematicians.

Some recent work on potential infinities uses the grossone, which can represent the "total" value of a potential infinity and allow one to perform some operations of arithmetic with it.

== Opposition from the Intuitionist school ==
The mathematical meaning of the term "actual" in actual infinity is synonymous with definite, completed, extended or existential, but not to be mistaken for physically existing. The question of whether natural or real numbers form definite sets is therefore independent of the question of whether infinite things exist physically in nature.

Proponents of intuitionism, from Kronecker onwards, reject the claim that there are actually infinite mathematical objects or sets. Consequently, they reconstruct the foundations of mathematics in a way that does not assume the existence of actual infinities. On the other hand, constructive analysis does accept the existence of the completed infinity of the integers.

For intuitionists, infinity is described as potential; terms synonymous with this notion are becoming or constructive. For example, Stephen Kleene describes the notion of a Turing machine tape as "a linear 'tape', (potentially) infinite in both directions." To access memory on the tape, a Turing machine moves a read head along it in finitely many steps: the tape is therefore only "potentially" infinite, since — while there is always the ability to take another step — infinity itself is never actually reached.

Mathematicians generally accept actual infinities. Georg Cantor is the most significant mathematician who defended actual infinities. He decided that it is possible for natural and real numbers to be definite sets, and that if one rejects the axiom of Euclidean finiteness (that states that actualities, singly and in aggregates, are necessarily finite), then one is not involved in any contradiction.

The present-day conventional finitist interpretation of ordinal and cardinal numbers is that they consist of a collection of special symbols, and an associated formal language, within which statements may be made. All such statements are necessarily finite in length. The soundness of the manipulations is founded only on the basic principles of a formal language: term algebras, term rewriting, and so on. More abstractly, both (finite) model theory and proof theory offer the needed tools to work with infinities. One does not have to "believe" in infinity in order to write down algebraically valid expressions employing symbols for infinity.

== See also ==
- Arbitrarily large
- Cardinality of the continuum

== Sources ==
- Aristotle, Physics
- Bernard Bolzano, 1851, Paradoxien des Unendlichen, Reclam, Leipzig.
- Bernard Bolzano 1837, Wissenschaftslehre, Sulzbach.
- Georg Cantor in E. Zermelo (ed.) 1966, Gesammelte Abhandlungen mathematischen und philosophischen Inhalts, Olms, Hildesheim.
- Richard Dedekind in 1960 Was sind und was sollen die Zahlen?, Vieweg, Braunschweig.
- Adolf Abraham Fraenkel 1923, Einleitung in die Mengenlehre, Springer, Berlin.
- Adolf Abraham Fraenkel, Y. Bar-Hillel, A. Levy 1984, Foundations of Set Theory, 2nd edn., North Holland, Amsterdam New York.
- Stephen C. Kleene 1952 (1971 edition, 10th printing), Introduction to Metamathematics, North-Holland Publishing Company, Amsterdam New York. ISBN 0-444-10088-1.
- H. Meschkowski 1981, Georg Cantor: Leben, Werk und Wirkung (2. Aufl.), BI, Mannheim.
- H. Meschkowski, W. Nilson (Hrsg.) 1991, Georg Cantor – Briefe, Springer, Berlin.
- Abraham Robinson 1979, Selected Papers, Vol. 2, W.A.J. Luxemburg, S. Koerner (Hrsg.), North Holland, Amsterdam.
