= Errett Bishop =

American mathematician (1928–1983)

Errett A. Bishop
- Born: July 14, 1928; Newton, Kansas
- Died: April 14, 1983 (aged 54); San Diego, California
- Education: University of Chicago
- Known for: Bishop set, Constructive analysis
- Scientific career
- Fields: Mathematics
- Workplaces: University of California at San Diego
- Doctoral advisor: Paul Halmos

Errett Albert Bishop (July 14, 1928 – April 14, 1983) was an American mathematician known for his work on analysis. He is best known for developing constructive analysis in his 1967 Foundations of Constructive Analysis, where he proved most of the important theorems in real analysis using "constructivist" methods.

== Life ==
Errett Bishop's father, Albert T. Bishop, graduated from the United States Military Academy at West Point, ending his career as professor of mathematics at Wichita State University in Kansas. Although he died when Bishop was less than 4 years old, he influenced Bishop's eventual career by the math texts he left behind, which is how Bishop discovered mathematics. Bishop grew up in Newton, Kansas. Bishop and his sister were apparent math prodigies.

Bishop entered the University of Chicago in 1944, obtaining both the BS and MS in 1947. The doctoral studies he began in that year were interrupted by two years in the US Army, 1950–52, doing mathematical research at the National Bureau of Standards. He completed his Ph.D. in 1954 under Paul Halmos; his thesis was titled Spectral Theory for Operations on Banach Spaces.

Bishop taught at the University of California, 1954–65. He spent the 1964–65 academic year at the Miller Institute for Basic Research in Berkeley. He was a visiting scholar at the Institute for Advanced Study in 1961–62. From 1965 until his death, he was professor at the University of California at San Diego.

Bishop's thoughts were started by two main events and they are mentioned during the conversation with Douglas S. Bridges. The events are retold by Bridges as follows:

"A burning question for me, as for many who have read his work, was 'How did Errett come to constructive mathematics in the first place?' He told me of two events that helped to precipitate him in that direction. The first was when he had been lecturing on truth tables in one of those low-level courses that he described unforgettably as 'mathematics for gracious living'. A couple of bright students had come to him after the lecture, to argue against his definition of (material) implication and in favour of the notion that the truth of the antecedent in some sense causes that of the consequent; this got Errett thinking about implication, a topic that bothered him right up to his death. The second event occurred in his own research in several complex variables, a subject in which he had a huge reputation before entering the constructive domain: in trying to visualise some hypersurfaces, he had come to the conclusion (perhaps through some kind of Brouwerian example?) that those surfaces could not be constructed in any real sense; from which he was led to ask what it meant to assert their existence."

== Work ==
Bishop's work falls into five categories:

1. Polynomial and rational approximation. Examples are extensions of Mergelyan's approximation theorem and the theorem of Frigyes Riesz and Marcel Riesz concerning measures on the unit circle orthogonal to polynomials.
2. The general theory of function algebras. Here Bishop worked on uniform algebras (commutative Banach algebras with unit whose norms are the spectral norms) proving results such as antisymmetric decomposition of a uniform algebra, the Bishop–DeLeeuw theorem, and the proof of existence of Jensen measures. Bishop wrote a 1965 survey "Uniform algebras," examining the interaction between the theory of uniform algebras and that of several complex variables.
3. Banach spaces and operator theory, the subject of his thesis. He introduced what is now called the Bishop condition, useful in the theory of decomposable operators.
4. The theory of functions of several complex variables. An example is his 1962 "Analyticity in certain Banach spaces." He proved important results in this area such as the biholomorphic embedding theorem for a Stein manifold as a closed submanifold in $\mathbb{\Complex}^n$, and a new proof of Remmert's proper mapping theorem.
5. Constructive mathematics. Bishop became interested in foundational issues while at the Miller Institute. His now-famous Foundations of Constructive Analysis (1967) aimed to show that a constructive treatment of analysis is feasible, something about which Weyl had been pessimistic. A 1985 revision, called Constructive Analysis, was completed with the assistance of Douglas Bridges.

In 1972, Bishop (with Henry Cheng) published Constructive Measure Theory.

In the later part of his life, Bishop was seen as the leading mathematician in the area of constructivist mathematics. In 1966, he was invited to speak at the International Congress of Mathematicians on that theme. His talk was titled "The Constructivisation of Abstract Mathematical Analysis." The American Mathematical Society invited him to give four hour-long lectures as part of the Colloquium Lectures series. The title of his lectures was "Schizophrenia of Contemporary Mathematics." Abraham Robinson wrote of Bishop's work in constructivist mathematics: "Even those who are not willing to accept Bishop's basic philosophy must be impressed with the great analytical power displayed in his work." Robinson, however, wrote in his review of Bishop's book that Bishop's historical commentary is "more vigorous than accurate".

== Quotes ==
- (A) "Mathematics is common sense";
- (B) "Do not ask whether a statement is true until you know what it means";
- (C) "A proof is any completely convincing argument";
- (D) "Meaningful distinctions deserve to be preserved".

(Items A through D are principles of constructivism from his Schizophrenia in Contemporary Mathematics. American Mathematical Society. 1973. (Reprinted in Rosenblatt 1985.)

- "The primary concern of mathematics is number, and this means the positive integers. . . . In the words of Kronecker, the positive integers were created by God. Kronecker would have expressed it even better if he had said that the positive integers were created by God for the benefit of man (and other finite beings). Mathematics belongs to man, not to God. We are not interested in properties of the positive integers that have no descriptive meaning for finite man. When a man proves a positive integer to exist, he should show how to find it. If God has mathematics of his own that needs to be done, let him do it himself." (Bishop 1967, Chapter 1, A Constructivist Manifesto, page 2)
- "We are not contending that idealistic mathematics is worthless from the constructive point of view. This would be as silly as contending that unrigorous mathematics is worthless from the classical point of view. Every theorem proved with idealistic methods presents a challenge: to find a constructive version, and to give it a constructive proof." (Bishop 1967, Preface, page x)
- "Theorem 1 is the famous theorem of Cantor, that the real numbers are uncountable. The proof is essentially Cantor's 'diagonal' proof. Both Cantor's theorem and his method of proof are of great importance." (Bishop 1967, Chapter 2, Calculus and the Real Numbers, page 25)
- "The real numbers, for certain purposes, are too thin. Many beautiful phenomena become fully visible only when the complex numbers are brought to the fore." (Bishop 1967, Chapter 5, Complex Analysis, page 113)
- "It is clear that many of the results in this book could be programmed for a computer, by some such procedure as that indicated above. In particular, it is likely that most of the results of Chaps. 2, 4, 5, 9, 10, and 11 could be presented as computer programs. As an example, a complete separable metric space X can be described by a sequence of real numbers, and therefore by a sequence of integers, simply by listing the distances between each pair of elements of a given countable dense set. . . . As written, this book is person-oriented rather than computer-oriented. It would be of great interest to have a computer-oriented version." (Bishop 1967, Appendix B, Aspects of Constructive Truth, pages 356 and 357)
- "Very possibly classical mathematics will cease to exist as an independent discipline" (Bishop, 1970, p. 54)
- "Brouwer's criticisms of classical mathematics were concerned with what I shall refer to as 'the debasement of meaning'" (Bishop in Rosenblatt, 1985, page 1)

== See also ==
- Bishop set
- Constructive analysis
- Constructivism (mathematics)
- Criticism of non-standard analysis
