= Constructivism (philosophy of mathematics) =

Philosphical view that existence proofs must be constructive

In philosophy of mathematics, constructivism asserts that it is necessary to find (or "construct") a specific example of a mathematical object in order to prove that an example exists. Contrastingly, in classical mathematics, one can prove the existence of a mathematical object without "finding" that object explicitly, by assuming its non-existence and then deriving a contradiction from that assumption. Such a proof by contradiction might be called non-constructive, and a constructivist might reject it. The constructive viewpoint involves a verificational interpretation of the existential quantifier, which is at odds with its classical interpretation.

There are many forms of constructivism. These include the program of intuitionism founded by Brouwer, the finitism of Hilbert and Bernays, the constructive recursive mathematics of Shanin and Markov, and Bishop's program of constructive analysis. Constructivism also includes the study of constructive set theories such as CZF and the study of topos theory.

Constructivism is often identified with intuitionism, although intuitionism is only one constructivist program. Intuitionism maintains that the foundations of mathematics lie in the individual mathematician's intuition, thereby making mathematics an intrinsically subjective activity. Other forms of constructivism are not based on this viewpoint of intuition, and are compatible with an objective viewpoint on mathematics.

== Constructive mathematics ==
Much constructive mathematics uses intuitionistic logic, which is essentially classical logic without the law of the excluded middle. (This law states that, for any proposition, either that proposition is true or its negation is.) This is not to say that the law of the excluded middle is denied entirely in constructivism; special cases of the law will be provable. It is just that the general law is not assumed as an axiom. The law of non-contradiction (which states that contradictory statements cannot both be true at the same time) is still valid.

For instance, in Heyting arithmetic, one can prove that for any proposition p that does not contain quantifiers, $\forall x,y,z,\ldots \in \mathbb{N} : p \vee \neg p$ is a theorem (where x, y, z ... are the free variables in the proposition p). In this sense, propositions restricted to the finite are still regarded as being either true or false, as they are in classical mathematics, but this bivalence does not extend to propositions that refer to infinite collections.

In fact, L. E. J. Brouwer, founder of the intuitionist school, viewed the law of the excluded middle as abstracted from finite experience, and then applied to the infinite without justification. For instance, Goldbach's conjecture is the assertion that every even number greater than 2 is the sum of two prime numbers. It is possible to test for any particular even number whether it is the sum of two primes (for instance by exhaustive search), so any one of them is either the sum of two primes or it is not. And so far, every one thus tested has in fact been the sum of two primes.

But there is no known proof that all of them are so, nor any known proof that not all of them are so; nor is it even known whether either a proof or a disproof of Goldbach's conjecture must exist (the conjecture may be undecidable in traditional ZF set theory). Thus to Brouwer, we are not justified in asserting "either Goldbach's conjecture is true, or it is not." And while the conjecture may one day be solved, the argument applies to similar unsolved problems. To Brouwer, the law of the excluded middle is tantamount to assuming that every mathematical problem has a solution.

With the omission of the law of the excluded middle as an axiom, the remaining logical system has an existence property that classical logic does not have: whenever $\exists_{x\in X} P(x)$ is proven constructively, then in fact $P(a)$ is proven constructively for (at least) one particular $a\in X$, often called a witness. Thus the proof of the existence of a mathematical object is tied to the possibility of its construction.

=== Example from real analysis ===
In classical real analysis, one way to define a real number is as an equivalence class of Cauchy sequences of rational numbers.

In constructive mathematics, one way to construct a real number is as a function ƒ that takes a positive integer $n$ and outputs a rational ƒ(n), together with a function g that takes a positive integer n and outputs a positive integer g(n) such that

$$\forall n\ \forall i,j \ge g(n)\quad |f(i) - f(j)| \le {1 \over n}$$

so that as n increases, the values of ƒ(n) get closer and closer together. We can use ƒ and g together to compute as close a rational approximation as we like to the real number they represent.

Under this definition, a simple representation of the real number e is:

$$f(n) = \sum_{i=0}^n {1 \over i!}, \quad g(n) = n.$$

This definition corresponds to the classical definition using Cauchy sequences, except with a constructive twist: for a classical Cauchy sequence, it is required that, for any given distance, there exists (in a classical sense) a member in the sequence after which all members are closer together than that distance. In the constructive version, it is required that, for any given distance, it is possible to actually specify a point in the sequence where this happens (this required specification is often called the modulus of convergence). In fact, the standard constructive interpretation of the mathematical statement

$$\forall n : \exists m : \forall i,j \ge m: |f(i) - f(j)| \le {1 \over n}$$

is precisely the existence of the function computing the modulus of convergence. Thus the difference between the two definitions of real numbers can be thought of as the difference in the interpretation of the statement "for all... there exists..."

This then opens the question as to what sort of function from a countable set to a countable set, such as f and g above, can actually be constructed. Different versions of constructivism diverge on this point. Constructions can be defined as broadly as free choice sequences, which is the intuitionistic view, or as narrowly as algorithms (or more technically, the computable functions), or even left unspecified. If, for instance, the algorithmic view is taken, then the reals as constructed here are essentially what classically would be called the computable numbers.

=== Cardinality ===
To take the algorithmic interpretation above would seem at odds with classical notions of cardinality. By enumerating algorithms, we can show that the computable numbers are classically countable. And yet Cantor's diagonal argument here shows that real numbers have uncountable cardinality. To identify the real numbers with the computable numbers would then be a contradiction. Furthermore, the diagonal argument seems perfectly constructive.

Indeed Cantor's diagonal argument can be presented constructively, in the sense that given a bijection between the natural numbers and real numbers, one constructs a real number not in the functions range, and thereby establishes a contradiction. One can enumerate algorithms to construct a function T, about which we initially assume that it is a function from the natural numbers onto the reals. But, to each algorithm, there may or may not correspond a real number, as the algorithm may fail to satisfy the constraints, or even be non-terminating (T is a partial function), so this fails to produce the required bijection. In short, one who takes the view that real numbers are (individually) effectively computable interprets Cantor's result as showing that the real numbers (collectively) are not recursively enumerable.

Still, one might expect that since T is a partial function from the natural numbers onto the real numbers, that therefore the real numbers are no more than countable. And, since every natural number can be trivially represented as a real number, therefore the real numbers are no less than countable. They are, therefore exactly countable. However this reasoning is not constructive, as it still does not construct the required bijection. The classical theorem proving the existence of a bijection in such circumstances, namely the Cantor–Bernstein–Schroeder theorem, is non-constructive. It has recently been shown that the Cantor–Bernstein–Schroeder theorem implies the law of the excluded middle, hence there can be no constructive proof of the theorem.

=== Axiom of choice ===
The status of the axiom of choice in constructive mathematics is complicated by the different approaches of different constructivist programs. One trivial meaning of "constructive", used informally by mathematicians, is "provable in ZF set theory without the axiom of choice." However, proponents of more limited forms of constructive mathematics would assert that ZF itself is not a constructive system.

In intuitionistic theories of type theory (especially higher-type arithmetic), many forms of the axiom of choice are permitted. For example, the axiom AC_{11} can be paraphrased to say that for any relation R on the set of real numbers, if you have proved that for each real number x there is a real number y such that R(x,y) holds, then there is actually a function F such that R(x,F(x)) holds for all real numbers. Similar choice principles are accepted for all finite types. The motivation for accepting these seemingly nonconstructive principles is the intuitionistic understanding of the proof that "for each real number x there is a real number y such that R(x,y) holds". According to the BHK interpretation, this proof itself is essentially the function F that is desired. The choice principles that intuitionists accept do not imply the law of the excluded middle.

However, in certain axiom systems for constructive set theory, the axiom of choice does imply the law of the excluded middle (in the presence of other axioms), as shown by the Diaconescu-Goodman-Myhill theorem. Some constructive set theories include weaker forms of the axiom of choice, such as the axiom of dependent choice in Myhill's set theory.

=== Measure theory ===
Classical measure theory is fundamentally non-constructive, since the classical definition of Lebesgue measure does not describe any way to compute the measure of a set or the integral of a function. In fact, if one thinks of a function just as a rule that "inputs a real number and outputs a real number" then there cannot be any algorithm to compute the integral of a function, since any algorithm would only be able to call finitely many values of the function at a time, and finitely many values are not enough to compute the integral to any nontrivial accuracy. The solution to this conundrum, carried out first in Bishop (1967), is to consider only functions that are written as the pointwise limit of continuous functions (with known modulus of continuity), with information about the rate of convergence. An advantage of constructivizing measure theory is that if one can prove that a set is constructively of full measure, then there is an algorithm for finding a point in that set (again see Bishop (1967)).

== The place of constructivism in mathematics ==
Traditionally, some mathematicians have been suspicious, if not antagonistic, towards mathematical constructivism, largely because of limitations they believed it to pose for constructive analysis. These views were forcefully expressed by David Hilbert in 1928, when he wrote in Grundlagen der Mathematik, "Taking the principle of excluded middle from the mathematician would be the same, say, as proscribing the telescope to the astronomer or to the boxer the use of his fists".

Errett Bishop, in his 1967 work Foundations of Constructive Analysis, worked to dispel these fears by developing a great deal of traditional analysis in a constructive framework.

Even though most mathematicians do not accept the constructivist's thesis that only mathematics done based on constructive methods is sound, constructive methods are increasingly of interest on non-ideological grounds. For example, constructive proofs in analysis may ensure witness extraction, in such a way that working within the constraints of the constructive methods may make finding witnesses to theories easier than using classical methods. Applications for constructive mathematics have also been found in typed lambda calculi, topos theory and categorical logic, which are notable subjects in foundational mathematics and computer science. In algebra, for such entities as topoi and Hopf algebras, the structure supports an internal language that is a constructive theory; working within the constraints of that language is often more intuitive and flexible than working externally by such means as reasoning about the set of possible concrete algebras and their homomorphisms.

Physicist Lee Smolin writes in Three Roads to Quantum Gravity that topos theory is "the right form of logic for cosmology" (page 30) and "In its first forms it was called 'intuitionistic logic'" (page 31). "In this kind of logic, the statements an observer can make about the universe are divided into at least three groups: those that we can judge to be true, those that we can judge to be false and those whose truth we cannot decide upon at the present time" (page 28).

== Mathematicians who have made major contributions to constructivism ==
- Leopold Kronecker (old constructivism, semi-intuitionism)
- L. E. J. Brouwer (founder of intuitionism)
- A. A. Markov (forefather of Russian school of constructivism)
- Arend Heyting (formalized intuitionistic logic and theories)
- Per Martin-Löf (founder of constructive type theories)
- Errett Bishop (promoted a version of constructivism claimed to be consistent with classical mathematics)
- Paul Lorenzen (developed constructive analysis)
- Martin Hyland (discovered the effective topos in realizability)

== Branches ==
- Constructive logic
- Constructive set theory
- Constructive type theory
- Constructive analysis
- Constructive non-standard analysis

== See also ==
- Computability theory – Study of computable functions and Turing degrees
- Constructive proof – Method of proof in mathematics
- Finitism – Philosophy of mathematics that accepts only finite objects
- Game semantics – Approach to formal semantics
- Inhabited set – Property of sets used in constructive mathematics
- Intuitionism – Approach in philosophy of mathematics and logic
- Intuitionistic type theory – Alternative foundation of mathematics
