= Arend Heyting =

Dutch mathematician and logician (1898–1980)

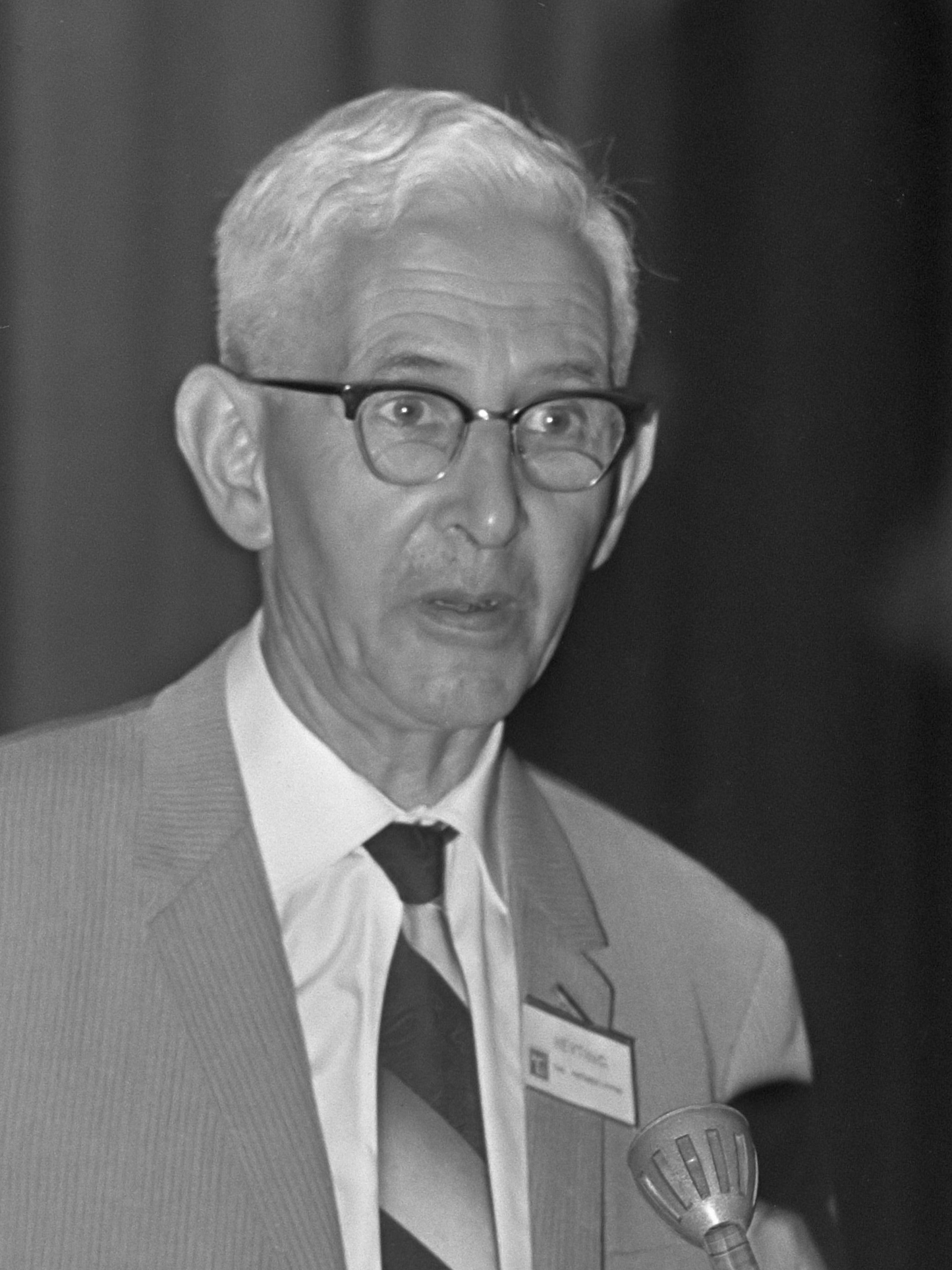
- Arend Heyting (1967)
- Born: 9 May 1898; Amsterdam, Netherlands
- Died: 9 July 1980 (aged 82); Lugano, Switzerland
- Education: University of Amsterdam
- Known for: Heyting algebra Heyting arithmetic Heyting field Brouwer–Heyting–Kolmogorov interpretation Intuitionistic logic Contributions to intuitionism
- Scientific career
- Fields: Mathematics
- Workplaces: University of Amsterdam
- Doctoral advisor: L. E. J. Brouwer
- Doctoral students: Anne Sjerp Troelstra; Dirk van Dalen; J.J.A. Mooij; Bob van Rootselaar

Arend Heyting (Dutch: [ˈaːrənt ˈɦɛitɪŋ]; 9 May 1898 – 9 July 1980) was a Dutch mathematician and logician.

== Biography ==
Heyting was a student of Luitzen Egbertus Jan Brouwer at the University of Amsterdam, and did much to put intuitionistic logic on a footing where it could become part of mathematical logic. Heyting gave the first formal development of intuitionistic logic in order to codify Brouwer's way of doing mathematics. The inclusion of Brouwer's name in the Brouwer–Heyting–Kolmogorov interpretation is largely honorific, as Brouwer was opposed in principle to the formalisation of certain intuitionistic principles (and went as far as calling Heyting's work a "sterile exercise").

In 1942 he became a member of the Royal Netherlands Academy of Arts and Sciences.

Heyting was born in Amsterdam, Netherlands, and died in Lugano, Switzerland.

== Selected publications ==
- Heyting, Arend (1930). "Die formalen Regeln der intuitionistischen Logik". Sitzungsberichte der preußischen Akademie der Wissenschaften, phys.-math. Klasse (in German): 42–56, 57–71, 158–169. OCLC 601568391. (abridged reprint in Berka, Karel; Kreiser, Lothar, eds. (1986). Logik-Texte. De Gruyter. pp. 188–192. doi:10.1515/9783112645826. ISBN 978-3-11-264582-6.)
- — (1934). Mathematische Grundlagenforschung. Intuitionismus. Beweistheorie (in German). Berlin: Springer.
- — (1941). "Untersuchungen der intuitionistischen Algebra". Verh. Nederl. Akad. Wetensch. Afd. Natuurk. Sect. 1 (in German). 18 (2): 36.
- — (1956). Intuitionism. An Introduction. Amsterdam: North-Holland Publishing Co.
- — (1959). "Axioms for intuitionistic plane affine geometry. The axiomatic method. With special reference to geometry and physics". In Henkin, L.; Suppes, P.; Tarski, A. (eds.). Proceedings of an International Symposium held at the Univ. of Calif., Berkeley, Dec. 26, 1957–Jan. 4, 1958. Studies in Logic and the Foundations of Mathematics. Amsterdam: North-Holland Publishing Co. pp. 160–173.
- — (1962). "After thirty years". In Nagel, E. (ed.). Logic, Methodology and Philosophy of Science (Proc. 1960 Internat. Congr.). Stanford, Calif.: Stanford Univ. Press. pp. 194–197.
- — (1963). Axiomatic projective geometry. Bibliotheca Mathematica. Vol. V. New York; Groningen; Amsterdam: Interscience Publishers John Wiley & Sons, Inc.; P. Noordhoff N.V.; North-Holland Publishing Co.
- — (1966). Intuitionism: An Introduction (Second revised ed.). Amsterdam: North-Holland Publishing Co.
- — (1973). "Address to Professor A. Robinson. At the occasion of the Brouwer memorial lecture given by Prof. A. Robinson on the 26th April 1973". Nieuw Arch. Wisk. (3). 21: 134–137.
- — (1974). Mathematische Grundlagenforschung, Intuitionismus, Beweistheorie (in German) (Reprint ed.). Berlin–New York: Springer-Verlag.
- — (1980). Axiomatic projective geometry. Bibliotheca Mathematica. Vol. V (Second ed.). Groningen; Amsterdam–New York: Wolters-Noordhoff Scientific Publications, Ltd.; North-Holland Publishing Co.
