= L. E. J. Brouwer =

Dutch mathematician and logician

- Born: Luitzen Egbertus Jan Brouwer; 27 February 1881; Overschie, Netherlands
- Died: 2 December 1966 (aged 85); Blaricum, Netherlands
- Education: University of Amsterdam
- Known for: Brouwer–Hilbert controversy Brouwer fixed-point theorem Brouwer–Heyting–Kolmogorov interpretation Jordan-Brouwer separation theorem Kleene–Brouwer order Phragmen–Brouwer theorem Tietze-Urysohn-Brouwer extension theorem Simplicial approximation theorem Bar induction Degree of a continuous mapping Indecomposability; Indecomposable continuum Invariance of domain Spread; Proving hairy ball theorem Intuitionism
- Relatives: Hendrik Albertus Brouwer (brother)
- Awards: Foreign Member of the Royal Society
- Scientific career
- Fields: Mathematics
- Workplaces: University of Amsterdam
- Thesis: Over de grondslagen der wiskunde (1907)
- Doctoral advisor: Diederik Korteweg
- Doctoral students: Arend Heyting

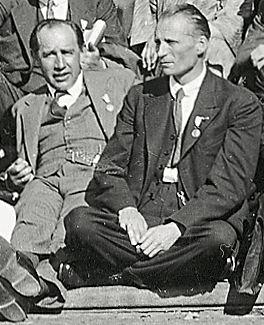
Brouwer (right) at the International Mathematical Congress, Zurich 1932

Luitzen Egbertus Jan "Bertus" Brouwer (Note: The Dutch pronunciation of Luitzen Egbertus Jan Brouwer is [ˈlœytsən ɛɣˈbɛrtʏ ɕɑm ˈbrʌu.ər, -tsə ʔɛɣ-]. The words in isolation are pronounced [ˈlœytsə(n)], [ɛɣˈbɛrtʏs], [jɑn] and [ˈbrʌuər], respectively. The surname Brouwer is pronounced /ˈbraʊ.ər/ BROW-ər in English.) (27 February 1881 – 2 December 1966) was a Dutch mathematician and philosopher who worked in topology, set theory, measure theory and complex analysis. Regarded as one of the greatest mathematicians of the 20th century, he is known as one of the founders of modern topology, particularly for establishing his fixed-point theorem and the topological invariance of dimension.

Brouwer also became a major figure in the philosophy of intuitionism, a constructivist school of mathematics which argues that mathematics is a cognitive construct rather than a type of objective truth. This position led to the Brouwer–Hilbert controversy, in which Brouwer sparred with his formalist colleague David Hilbert. Brouwer's ideas were subsequently taken up by his student Arend Heyting and Hilbert's former student Hermann Weyl. In addition to his mathematical work, Brouwer also published the short philosophical tract Life, Art, and Mysticism (1905).

== Biography ==
Brouwer was born to Dutch Protestant parents. Early in his career, Brouwer proved a number of theorems in the emerging field of topology. The most important were his fixed point theorem, the topological invariance of degree, and the topological invariance of dimension. Among mathematicians generally, the best known is the first one, usually referred to now as the Brouwer fixed point theorem. It is a corollary to the second, concerning the topological invariance of degree, which is the best known among algebraic topologists. The third theorem is perhaps the hardest.

Brouwer also proved the simplicial approximation theorem in the foundations of algebraic topology, which justifies the reduction to combinatorial terms, after sufficient subdivision of simplicial complexes, of the treatment of general continuous mappings. In 1912, at age 31, he was elected a member of the Royal Netherlands Academy of Arts and Sciences. He was an Invited Speaker of the ICM in 1908 at Rome and in 1912 at Cambridge, UK. He was elected to the American Philosophical Society in 1943.

Brouwer founded intuitionism, a philosophy of mathematics that challenged the then-prevailing formalism of David Hilbert and his collaborators, who included Paul Bernays, Wilhelm Ackermann, and John von Neumann (cf. Kleene (1952), p. 46–59). A variety of constructive mathematics, intuitionism is a philosophy of the foundations of mathematics. It is sometimes (simplistically) characterized by saying that its adherents do not admit the law of excluded middle as a general axiom in mathematical reasoning, although it may be proven as a theorem in some special cases.

Brouwer was a member of the Significs Group. It formed part of the early history of semiotics—the study of symbols—around Victoria, Lady Welby in particular. The original meaning of his intuitionism probably cannot be completely disentangled from the intellectual milieu of that group.

In 1905, at the age of 24, Brouwer expressed his philosophy of life in a short tract Life, Art and Mysticism, which has been described by the mathematician Martin Davis as "drenched in romantic pessimism" (Davis (2002), p. 94). Arthur Schopenhauer had a formative influence on Brouwer, not least because he insisted that all concepts be fundamentally based on sense intuitions. Brouwer then "embarked on a self-righteous campaign to reconstruct mathematical practice from the ground up so as to satisfy his philosophical convictions"; indeed his thesis advisor refused to accept his Chapter II "as it stands, ... all interwoven with some kind of pessimism and mystical attitude to life which is not mathematics, nor has anything to do with the foundations of mathematics" (Davis, p. 94 quoting van Stigt, p. 41). Nevertheless, in 1908:

"... Brouwer, in a paper titled 'The untrustworthiness of the principles of logic', challenged the belief that the rules of the classical logic, which have come down to us essentially from Aristotle (384--322 B.C.) have an absolute validity, independent of the subject matter to which they are applied" (Kleene (1952), p. 46).

"After completing his dissertation, Brouwer made a conscious decision to temporarily keep his contentious ideas under wraps and to concentrate on demonstrating his mathematical prowess" (Davis (2000), p. 95); by 1910 he had published a number of important papers, in particular the Fixed Point Theorem. Hilbert—the formalist with whom the intuitionist Brouwer would ultimately spend years in conflict—admired the young man and helped him receive a regular academic appointment (1912) at the University of Amsterdam (Davis, p. 96). It was then that "Brouwer felt free to return to his revolutionary project which he was now calling intuitionism " (ibid).

Both Brouwer and Hilbert worked as editors at the prestigious mathematical journal, Mathematische Annalen. Hilbert was the chief editor of the journal alongside Blumenthal, Carathéodory, and Einstein, and Brouwer was an associate editor. The relationship between Brouwer and Hilbert began to deteriorate as their intellectual feud began to become a personal one, culminating in the eventual dismissal of Brouwer by Hilbert. Carathéodory sought out Einstein's advice on this matter and Einstein chose to remain neutral in the feud, leading to Brouwer's dismissal. Abraham Fraenkel argues that the reason for this dismissal was Brouwer's turn towards pushing ideas of Germanic Aryan supremacy; however, there does not exist any evidence of Brouwer's involvement with the German Nazi party, nor the National Socialist Movement in the Netherlands. Brouwer was not known to hold onto any nationalistic views by his contemporaries, and his views were akin to the Germanic idealists and romanticists of the time.

In later years Brouwer became relatively isolated; the development of intuitionism at its source was taken up by his student Arend Heyting. Dutch mathematician and historian of mathematics Bartel Leendert van der Waerden attended lectures given by Brouwer in later years, and commented: "Even though his most important research contributions were in topology, Brouwer never gave courses in topology, but always on — and only on — the foundations of his intuitionism. It seemed that he was no longer convinced of his results in topology because they were not correct from the point of view of intuitionism, and he judged everything he had done before, his greatest output, false according to his philosophy."

About his last years, Davis (2002) remarks:

"...he felt more and more isolated, and spent his last years under the spell of 'totally unfounded financial worries and a paranoid fear of bankruptcy, persecution and illness.' He was killed in 1966 at the age of 85, struck by a vehicle while crossing the street in front of his house." (Davis, p. 100 quoting van Stigt. p. 110.)

== Bibliography ==
=== In English translation ===
- Jean van Heijenoort, 1967 3rd printing 1976 with corrections, A Source Book in Mathematical Logic, 1879-1931. Harvard University Press, Cambridge MA, ISBN 0-674-32449-8 pbk. The original papers are prefaced with valuable commentary.
  - 1923. L. E. J. Brouwer: "On the significance of the principle of excluded middle in mathematics, especially in function theory." With two Addenda and corrigenda, 334-45. Brouwer gives brief synopsis of his belief that the law of excluded middle cannot be "applied without reservation even in the mathematics of infinite systems" and gives two examples of failures to illustrate his assertion.
  - 1925. A. N. Kolmogorov: "On the principle of excluded middle", pp. 414–437. Kolmogorov supports most of Brouwer's results but disputes a few; he discusses the ramifications of intuitionism with respect to "transfinite judgements", e.g. transfinite induction.
  - 1927. L. E. J. Brouwer: "On the domains of definition of functions". Brouwer's intuitionistic treatment of the continuum, with an extended commentary.
  - 1927. David Hilbert: "The foundations of mathematics," 464-80
  - 1927. L. E. J. Brouwer: "Intuitionistic reflections on formalism," 490-92. Brouwer lists four topics on which intuitionism and formalism might "enter into a dialogue." Three of the topics involve the law of excluded middle.
  - 1927. Hermann Weyl: "Comments on Hilbert's second lecture on the foundations of mathematics," 480-484. In 1920 Weyl, Hilbert's prize pupil, sided with Brouwer against Hilbert. But in this address Weyl "while defending Brouwer against some of Hilbert's criticisms...attempts to bring out the significance of Hilbert's approach to the problems of the foundations of mathematics."
- Ewald, William B., ed., 1996. From Kant to Hilbert: A Source Book in the Foundations of Mathematics, 2 vols. Oxford Univ. Press.
  - 1928. "Mathematics, science, and language," 1170-85.
  - 1928. "The structure of the continuum," 1186-96.
  - 1952. "Historical background, principles, and methods of intuitionism," 1197-1207.
- Brouwer, L. E. J., Collected Works, Vol. I, Amsterdam: North-Holland, 1975.
- Brouwer, L. E. J., Collected Works, Vol. II, Amsterdam: North-Holland, 1976.
- Brouwer, L. E. J., "Life, Art, and Mysticism," Notre Dame Journal of Formal Logic, vol. 37 (1996), pp. 389–429. Translated by W. P. van Stigt with an introduction by the translator, pp. 381–87. Davis quotes from this work, "a short book... drenched in romantic pessimism" (p. 94).
  - W. P. van Stigt, 1990, Brouwer's Intuitionism, Amsterdam: North-Holland, 1990

== See also ==
- Bar induction
- Constructivist epistemology
- George F. C. Griss
- Gerrit Mannoury
- List of pioneers in computer science
