= List of things named after David Hilbert =

David Hilbert (1862–1943), a mathematician, is the eponym of all of the things (and topics) listed below.

== Mathematics and physics ==
- Brouwer–Hilbert controversy
- Einstein–Hilbert action
- Einstein–Hilbert equations
- Hilbert algebra
- Hilbert C*-module
- Hilbert basis (linear programming)
- Hilbert class field
- Hilbert cube
- Hilbert curve
  - Hilbert curve scheduling
- Hilbert field
- Hilbert function
- Hilbert manifold
- Hilbert matrix
- Hilbert metric
- Hilbert modular form
- Hilbert modular variety
- Hilbert–Mumford criterion
- Hilbert number
- Hilbert plane
- Hilbert polynomial
  - Hilbert series
- Hilbert ring
- Hilbert–Samuel function
- Hilbert projection theorem
- Hilbert R-tree
- Hilbert reciprocity
- Hilbert scheme
- Hilbert space
  - Hilbert dimension
  - Projective Hilbert space
  - Reproducing kernel Hilbert space
  - Rigged Hilbert space
  - Semi-Hilbert space
- Hilbert spectrum
- Hilbert symbol
- Hilbert system
- Hilbert transform
  - Hilbert spectroscopy
  - Hilbert–Huang transform
  - Hilbert spectral analysis
- Hilbert-style deduction system
- Hilbert–Bernays paradox
- Hilbert–Bernays provability conditions
- Hilbert–Burch theorem
- Hilbert–Kunz function
- Hilbert–Poincaré series
- Hilbert–Pólya conjecture
- Hilbert–Schmidt inner product
  - Hilbert–Schmidt norm
  - Hilbert–Schmidt operator
  - Hilbert–Schmidt integral operator
- Hilbert–Schmidt theorem
- Hilbert–Serre theorem
- Hilbert–Smith conjecture
- Hilbert–Speiser theorem
- Hilbert–Waring theorem
- Hilbert's arithmetic of ends
- Hilbert's axioms
- Hilbert's basis theorem
- Hilbert's epsilon calculus
- Hilbert's inequality
- Hilbert's irreducibility theorem
- Hilbert's lemma
- Hilbert's Nullstellensatz
- Hilbert's paradox of the Grand Hotel
- Hilbert's problems
- Hilbert's program
- Hilbert's syzygy theorem
- Hilbert's theorem (differential geometry)
- Hilbert's Theorem 90
- Riemann–Hilbert correspondence
- Riemann–Hilbert problem

== Other ==
- David Hilbert Award
- Hilbert (crater)
