= Anne Bosworth Focke =

American mathematician (1868–1907)

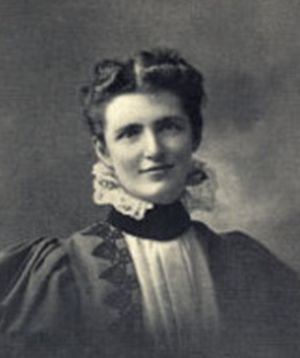
- Bosworth c. 1900
- Born: September 29, 1868; Woonsocket, Rhode Island, US
- Died: May 15, 1907 (aged 38); Cleveland, US
- Education: University of Göttingen; University of Chicago; Wellesley College
- Scientific career
- Fields: Mathematics
- Workplaces: Rhode Island College of Agriculture and Mechanic Arts
- Doctoral advisor: David Hilbert

Anne Lucy Bosworth Focke (September 29, 1868 – May 15, 1907) was an American mathematician who became the first mathematics professor at what is now the University of Rhode Island, and later became the first female doctoral student of David Hilbert.

== Early life ==
Bosworth was originally from Woonsocket, Rhode Island. When she was four, her father and a younger sister died, and she grew up in a family of women: her mother (a librarian), her grandmother (also widowed), and her aunt.

== Undergraduate education and academic work ==
Bosworth attended Woonsocket High School, and graduated from Wellesley College in 1890. At Wellesley, her classmates included mathematicians Grace Andrews and Clara Latimer Bacon.

She worked for two years as a teacher at Amesbury High School in Massachusetts, and was appointed as an instructor of mathematics at the Rhode Island College of Agriculture and Mechanic Arts (later to become the University of Rhode Island) in early 1892, the first year the school became a college. One month later she became its professor of mathematics and physics.

== Graduate education ==
While continuing to work at the college, Bosworth earned a master's degree at the University of Chicago from 1894 through 1896 through summer study with E. H. Moore and Oskar Bolza.

In 1898, taking a leave from her work for the college, Bosworth traveled to the University of Göttingen in Germany, where she worked under the supervision of David Hilbert. She defended her dissertation there in 1899, and was awarded the Ph.D. in 1900. Her dissertation was Begründung einer vom Parallelenaxiome unabhängigen Streckenrechnung, and concerned non-Euclidean geometry. She was David Hilbert's first female doctoral student, part of a group that later included Nadeschda Gernet (1902), Vera Myller (1906), Margarete Kahn (1909), Klara Löbenstein (1910), and Eva Koehler (1912).

== Later life ==
In 1901 Bosworth married Theodore Moses Focke, an American civil engineer, materials scientist, and applied mathematician whom she had met in Göttingen. Soon afterwards she followed her husband to Cleveland, Ohio, leaving her academic work (except for assisting her husband in grading) to raise a family of three children. She caught pneumonia in 1907 and died of it.
