= Hilbert's theorem =

Hilbert's theorem may refer to:

- Hilbert's theorem (differential geometry), stating there exists no complete regular surface of constant negative gaussian curvature immersed in $\mathbb{R}^{3}$
- Hilbert's Theorem 90, an important result on cyclic extensions of fields that leads to Kummer theory
- Hilbert's basis theorem, in commutative algebra, stating every ideal in the ring of multivariate polynomials over a Noetherian ring is finitely generated
- Hilbert's finiteness theorem, in invariant theory, stating that the ring of invariants of a reductive group is finitely generated
- Hilbert's irreducibility theorem, in number theory, concerning irreducible polynomials
- Hilbert's Nullstellensatz, the basis of algebraic geometry, establishing a fundamental relationship between geometry and algebra
- Hilbert's syzygy theorem, a result of commutative algebra in connection with the syzygy problem of invariant theory

== See also ==
- List of things named after David Hilbert
