= Lyubov Zapolskaya =

Russian mathematician (1871–1943)

- Любовь Запольская
- Portrait of Zapolskaya
- Born: 7 August 1871; Bigildino, Russian Empire
- Died: 3 November 1943 (aged 72)
- Education: St. Petersburg Higher Courses for Women; University of Göttingen (PhD)
- Scientific career
- Fields: Mathematics
- Thesis: Ueber die Theorie der relativ-Abel'schen-cubischen Zahlkörper (1902)
- Doctoral advisor: David Hilbert

Lyubov Nikolaevna Zapolskaya (Russian: Любовь Николаевна Запольская; German: Ljubowj Sapolsky; 7 August 1871 – 3 November 1943) was a Russian mathematician and the first woman to receive a master's degree in mathematics from a Russian university.

== Early life and education ==
Zapolskaya was born on 7 August 1871 in the village of Bigildino (Note: Also called Surki.) in the Ryazan Governorate of the Russian Empire to secondary school teachers Sofya Zapolskaya (née Kochurova) and Nikolay Zapolsky.

When she was five years old, her family moved to St. Petersburg, where her father taught Russian language and literature at the Second Military Gymnasium, and her mother taught at Vasileostrovskaya Girls' Gymnasium.

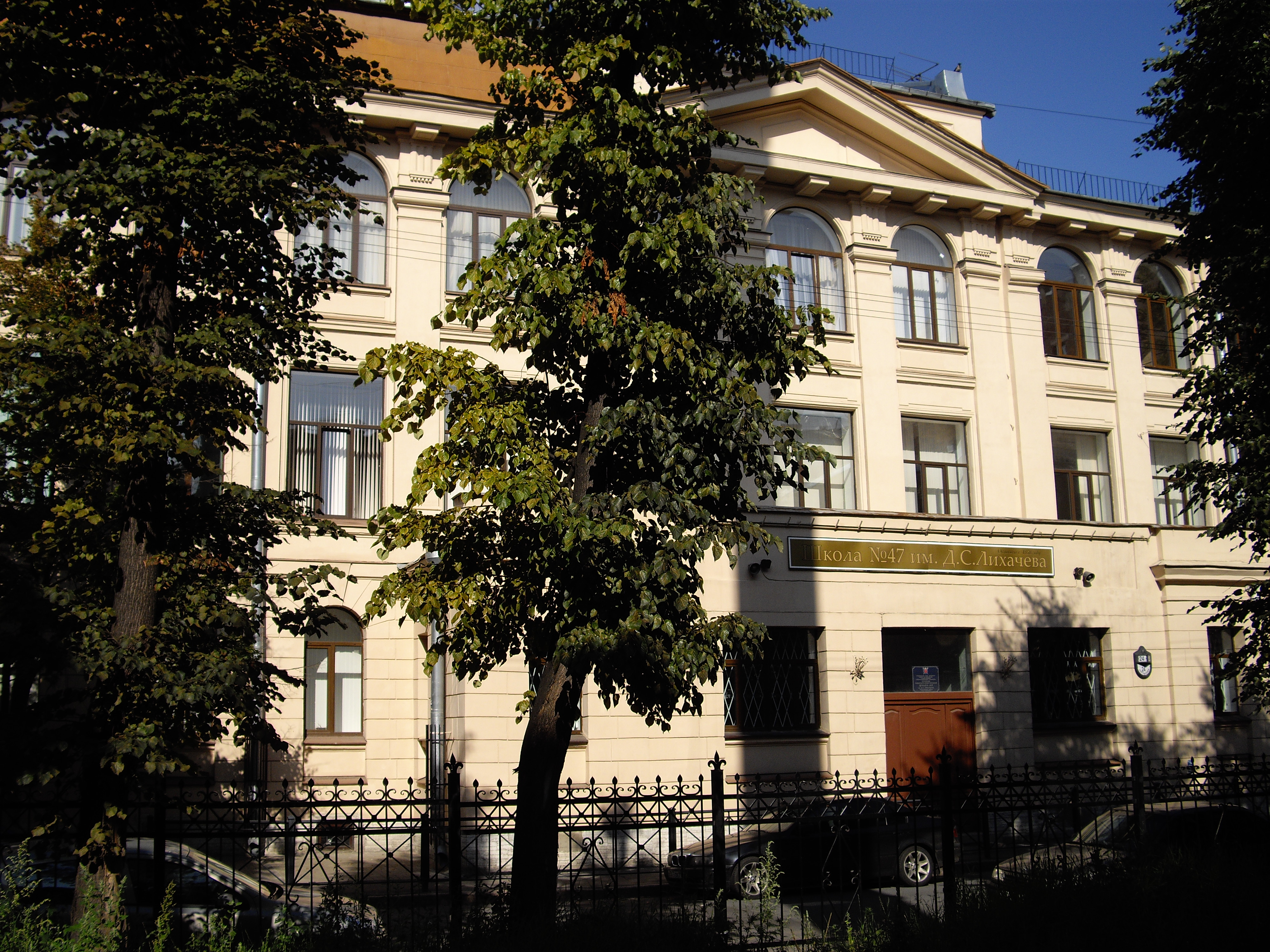
Exterior of the Petrovskaya Girls' Gymnasium, later renamed to D. S. Likhachev Secondary School No. 47.

In 1880, she enrolled in the Petrovskaya Girls' Gymnasium after receiving financial support from her cousin. She studied there for seven years and completed her studies in 1887 at the age of sixteen, receiving a gold medal for her academic achievements. She then took a three-year pedagogical course for women.

She then enrolled in the mathematics department of St. Petersburg Higher Courses for Women in late 1890. There, she studied analytic geometry, calculus, physics, and astronomy, and she developed an enthusiasm for higher algebra. She completed her studies in 1894. Russian universities did not admit women at the time, so Zapolskaya, inspired by Sofya Kovalevskaya, continued her education abroad. After obtaining permission from Ivan Delyanov, the Minister of Public Education, she traveled to Germany in October 1895 and attended the University of Göttingen.

At Göttingen, Zapolskaya studied under David Hilbert and Felix Klein. Her research focused on relatively abelian cubic number fields, drawing from Hilbert's prior work on algebraic number fields and his The Theory of Algebraic Number Fields. Her thesis defense took place in 1902, during which Hilbert praised her work, and she was awarded a Doctor of Philosophy in Mathematics, magna cum laude.

== Career ==
On 19 November 1902, Zapolskaya attended a meeting held by the Moscow Mathematical Society and presented her thesis. After her presentation, she was made a member of the society.

From 1903, she taught at the Higher Women's Courses in Moscow and at the Imperial Moscow University. The university published her thesis in 1905 and invited her to defend it. She defended it on 8 March 1905, with Leonid Lakhtin and Dmitri Egorov acting as the examiners. Following her defense, she was granted a master's degree in mathematics, making her the first woman to receive such a degree from a Russian university. She was subsequently appointed as a professor at the university.

== Later years and death ==
Zapolskaya died in Ryazan on 3 November 1943. She was buried at the Skorbyashchenskoye Cemetery.

== See also ==
- Nadeschda Gernet
- Sofya Kovalevskaya
