= Broggi =

Broggi is an Italian surname meaning "amber" mostly found in northern Italy. Notable people with the surname include:

- Alberto Broggi (born 1966), Italian professor, key person in vehicular robotics
- Ariel Broggi (born 1983), Argentine football defender
- Luigi Broggi (1851–1926), Italian architect
- Ugo Broggi (1880–1965), Italian actuary, mathematician, statistician, and economist
