= Paul Bernays =

Swiss mathematician (1888–1977)

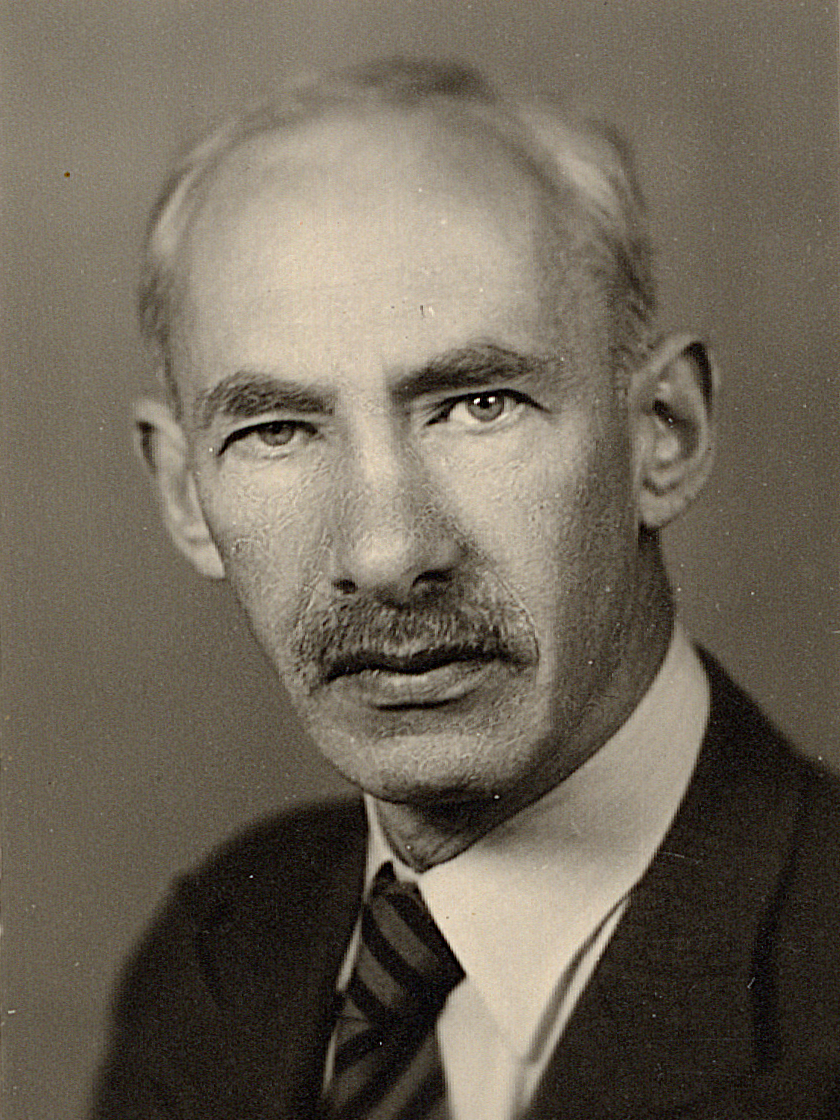
- Born: 17 October 1888; London, England
- Died: 18 September 1977 (aged 88); Zürich, Switzerland
- Education: University of Berlin
- Known for: Mathematical logic Axiomatic set theory Philosophy of mathematics Axiom of adjunction Axiom of dependent choice Grundlagen der Mathematik; Second-order arithmetic Bernays class theory Bernays–Schönfinkel class Bernays–Tarski axiom system Hilbert–Bernays provability conditions Hilbert–Bernays paradox Von Neumann–Bernays–Gödel set theory Founding Dialectica
- Scientific career
- Fields: Mathematics
- Thesis: Über die Darstellung von positiven, ganzen Zahlen durch die primitiven, binären quadratischen Formen einer nicht-quadratischen Diskriminante (1912)
- Doctoral advisor: Edmund Landau
- Doctoral students: Corrado Böhm; Julius Richard Büchi; Haskell Curry; Erwin Engeler; Gerhard Gentzen; Saunders Mac Lane
- Other notable students: Hao Wang

Paul Isaac Bernays (/bɜːrˈneɪz/ bur-NAYZ; Swiss Standard German: [bɛrˈnaɪs]; 17 October 1888 – 18 September 1977) was a Swiss mathematician who made significant contributions to mathematical logic, axiomatic set theory, and the philosophy of mathematics. He was an assistant and close collaborator of David Hilbert.

== Biography ==
Bernays was born into a distinguished German-Jewish family of scholars and businessmen. His great-grandfather, Isaac ben Jacob Bernays, served as chief rabbi of Hamburg from 1821 to 1849.

Bernays spent his childhood in Berlin, and attended the Köllnische Gymnasium, 1895–1907. At the University of Berlin, he studied mathematics under Issai Schur, Edmund Landau, Ferdinand Georg Frobenius, and Friedrich Schottky; philosophy under Alois Riehl, Carl Stumpf and Ernst Cassirer; and physics under Max Planck. At the University of Göttingen, he studied mathematics under David Hilbert, Edmund Landau, Hermann Weyl, and Felix Klein; physics under Woldemar Voigt and Max Born; and philosophy under Leonard Nelson.

In 1912, the University of Göttingen awarded him a Ph.D. in mathematics for a thesis, supervised by Landau, on the analytic number theory of binary quadratic forms. That same year, the University of Zurich awarded him habilitation for a thesis on complex analysis and Picard's theorem. The examiner was Ernst Zermelo. Bernays was Privatdozent at the University of Zurich, 1912–1917, where he came to know George Pólya. His collected communications with Kurt Gödel span many decades.

Starting in 1917, David Hilbert employed Bernays to assist him with his investigations of the foundation of arithmetic. Bernays also lectured on other areas of mathematics at the University of Göttingen. In 1918, that university awarded him a second habilitation for a thesis on the axiomatics of the propositional calculus of Principia Mathematica.

In 1922, Göttingen appointed Bernays extraordinary professor without tenure. His most successful student there was Gerhard Gentzen. After Nazi Germany enacted the Law for the Restoration of the Professional Civil Service in 1933, the university fired Bernays because of his Jewish ancestry.

After working privately for Hilbert for six months, Bernays and his family moved to Switzerland, whose nationality he had inherited from his father, and where the ETH Zurich employed him on occasion. He also visited the University of Pennsylvania and was a visiting scholar at the Institute for Advanced Study in 1935–36 and again in 1959–60.

== Mathematical work ==
His habilitation thesis was written under the supervision of Hilbert himself, on the topic of the axiomatisation of propositional logic in Whitehead and Russell's Principia Mathematica. It contains the first known proof of semantic completeness of propositional logic, which was proved again independently also by Emil Post later on.

Bernays's collaboration with Hilbert culminated in the two volume work, Grundlagen der Mathematik (English: Foundations of Mathematics) published in 1934 and 1939, which is discussed in Sieg and Ravaglia (2005). A proof in this work that a sufficiently strong consistent theory cannot contain its own reference functor is known as the Hilbert–Bernays paradox.

In seven papers, published between 1937 and 1954 in the Journal of Symbolic Logic (republished in Müller 1976), Bernays set out an axiomatic set theory whose starting point was a related theory John von Neumann had set out in the 1920s. Von Neumann's theory took the notions of function and argument as primitive. Bernays recast von Neumann's theory so that classes and sets were primitive. Bernays's theory, with modifications by Kurt Gödel, is known as von Neumann–Bernays–Gödel set theory.

== Publications ==
- Hilbert, David; Bernays, Paul (1934), Grundlagen der Mathematik. I, Die Grundlehren der mathematischen Wissenschaften, vol. 40, Berlin, New York: Springer-Verlag, ISBN 978-3-540-04134-4, JFM 60.0017.02, MR 0237246, archived from the original on 2011-05-17
- Grundsätzliche Betrachtungen zur Erkenntnistheorie (1937)
- Hilbert, David; Bernays, Paul (1939), Grundlagen der Mathematik. II, Die Grundlehren der mathematischen Wissenschaften, vol. 50, Berlin, New York: Springer-Verlag, ISBN 978-3-540-05110-7, JFM 65.0021.02, MR 0272596, archived from the original on 2011-05-17
- Bernays, Paul (1958), Axiomatic Set Theory, Studies in Logic and the Foundations of Mathematics, Amsterdam: North-Holland, ISBN 978-0-486-66637-2, MR 0106178
- Bernays, Paul (1976), Abhandlungen zur Philosophie der Mathematik (in German), Darmstadt: Wissenschaftliche Buchgesellschaft, ISBN 978-3-534-06706-0, MR 0444417
- Bernays, Paul; Schonfinkel, Moses (1928), "Zum Entscheidungsproblem der mathematischen Logik", Mathematische Annalen, 99 (99): 342–372, doi:10.1007/BF01459101, S2CID 122312654
