= Hilbert–Bernays paradox =

The Hilbert–Bernays paradox is a distinctive paradox belonging to the family of the paradoxes of reference. It is named after David Hilbert and Paul Bernays.

== History ==
The paradox appears in Hilbert and Bernays' Grundlagen der Mathematik and is used by them to show that a sufficiently strong consistent theory cannot contain its own reference functor. Although it was largely unnoticed over the course of the 20th century, it has recently been rediscovered and appreciated for the distinctive difficulties it presents.

== Formulation ==
Just as the semantic property of truth seems to be governed by the naive schema:

(T) The sentence ′P′ is true if and only if P

(where single quotes refer to the linguistic expression inside the quotes), the semantic property of reference seems to be governed by the naive schema:

(R) If a exists, the referent of the name ′a′ is identical with a

Let us suppose, however, that for every expression e in the language, the language also contains a name <e> for that expression, and consider a name h for (natural) numbers satisfying:

(H) <h> is identical with ′(the referent of <h>)+1′

Suppose that, for some number n:

(1) The referent of <h> is identical with n

Then, surely, the referent of <h> exists, and so does (the referent of <h>)+1. By (R), it then follows that:

(2) The referent of ′(the referent of <h>)+1′ is identical with (the referent of <h>)+1

Therefore, by (H) and the principle of indiscernibility of identicals, it is the case that:

(3) The referent of h is identical with (the referent of h)+1

But, by two more applications of the indiscernibility of identicals, (1) and (3) yield:

(4) n is identical with n+1

But (4) is absurd, since no number is identical with its successor.

== Solutions ==
Since, given the diagonal lemma, every sufficiently strong theory will have to accept something like (H), absurdity can only be avoided either by rejecting the principle of naive reference (R) or by rejecting classical logic (which validates the reasoning from (R) and (H) to absurdity). On the first approach, typically whatever one says about the Liar paradox carries over smoothly to the Hilbert–Bernays paradox. The paradox presents instead distinctive difficulties for many solutions pursuing the second approach: for example, solutions to the Liar paradox that reject the law of excluded middle (which is not used by the Hilbert–Bernays paradox) have denied that there is such a thing as the referent of h; solutions to the Liar paradox that reject the law of noncontradiction (which is likewise not used by the Hilbert–Bernays paradox) have claimed that h refers to more than one object.
