= Nadeschda Gernet =

Russian mathematician and academic (1877–1943)

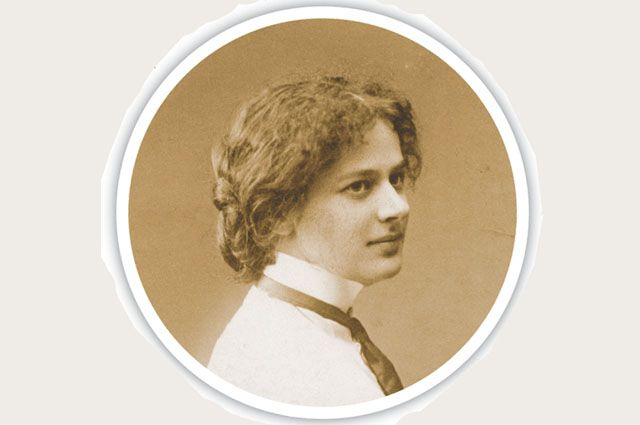
- Born: 18 April 1877; Simbirsk, Russia
- Died: 3 January 1943 (aged 65); Leningrad, Russian SFSR, Soviet Union
- Resting place: Smolensky Lutheran Cemetery
- Education: Women's University of Saint Petersburg; University of Göttingen, 1902; University of Moscow, 1915
- Occupations: Mathematician; academic

Nadeschda Nikolayevna Gernet (Note: Also cited as Nadezhda.) (Russian: Надежда Николаевна Гернет, romanized: Nadezhda Nikolayevna Gernet; 18 April 1877 – 1 January 1943) was a Russian mathematician, academic, and the second Russian woman to earn a doctorate. Gernet extended the calculus of variations to further functions on the basis developed by her instructor, David Hilbert, and was one of the first to include inequalities in the calculus of variations.

== Life and career ==
Gernet was born on 18 April 1877 in Simbirsk (now Ulyanovsk), to Nikolai V. Gernet, a state councillor and his wife Nadezhda.

In the spring of 1894, Gernet graduated from high school in Simbirsk with a gold medal. That fall, she began her higher education at Women's University of Saint Petersburg, where she took science and math-related classes. She was the first to graduate from the Women's University of Petersburg. Gernet's academic interests included, but were not limited to, mathematics, astronomy, and physics.

In 1902, Gernet received a PhD for her thesis Untersuchung zur Variationsrechnung ("On One New Method in the Variation of Calculus"), written at the University of Göttingen in Germany. She was the second female doctoral candidate to study under the instruction of David Hilbert, Anne Bosworth having been the first. In her thesis, Gernet extended the calculus of variations and generalized Hilbert's independence theorem to the case of two unknown functions. After defending her thesis, Gernet became the second woman in Russia to hold a doctorate, and the International Catalogue of Scientific Literature: First Volume indexed Gernet's book within the same year.

As her German doctorate was not recognized in Russia, in 1915 Gernet submitted her thesis On the Fundamental Simplest Problems of Variation Calculus to Moscow University in order to obtain a Russian master's degree which would also enable her to take up a university position. Gernet included a summary of the past achievements within the field of calculus of variations, and she was the first to attempt the inclusion of inequalities in the calculus of variations.

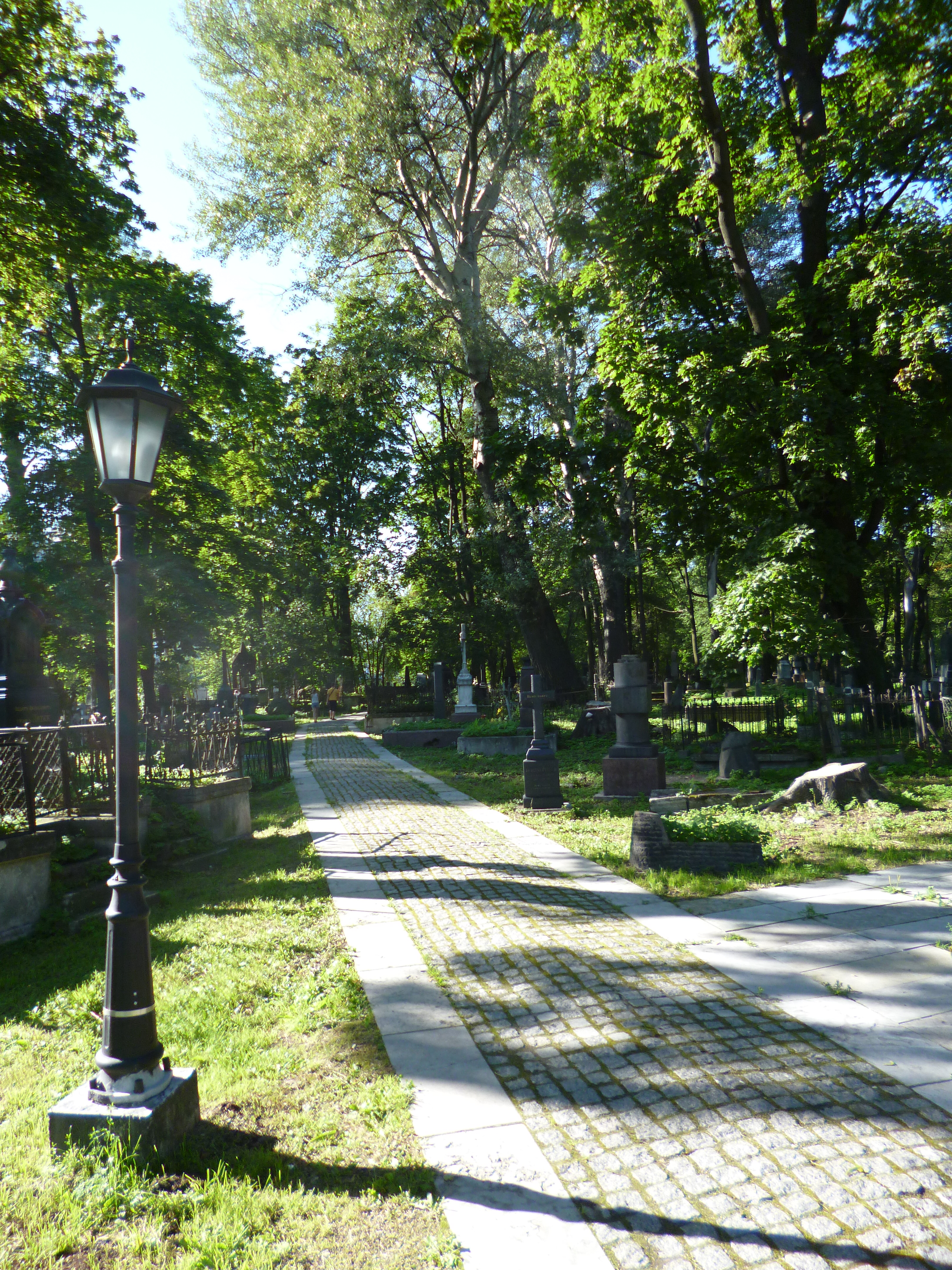
Smolensky Lutheran Cemetery

After defending her master's thesis and obtaining her degree with outstanding results from Moscow University, Gernet began her teaching career at the Saint Petersburg State University where she taught until 1929. Her curriculum focused on educating female students in the Women's Higher Courses. Soon after, she began teaching at the Leningrad Polytechnic Institute. On 1 January 1943, Gernet died in Leningrad (now St. Petersburg) during the blockades of the Siege of Leningrad and was buried in the Smolensky Lutheran Cemetery.

Gernet's publications raised new discussions, and her work encouraged further development in the calculus of variations.

== Publications ==
- On One New Method in the Variation of Calculus
- On the Fundamental Simplest Problems of Variation Calculus
