= Grundlagen der Mathematik =

Two-volume work by David Hilbert and Paul Bernays

Grundlagen der Mathematik (English: Foundations of Mathematics) is a two-volume work by David Hilbert and Paul Bernays. Originally published in 1934 and 1939, it presents fundamental mathematical ideas and introduced second-order arithmetic.

== Publication history ==
- 1934/1939 (Vol. I, II) First German edition, Springer
- 1944 Reprint of first edition by J. W. Edwards, Ann Arbor, Michigan.
- 1968/1970 (Vol. I, II) Second revised German edition, Springer
- 1979/1982 (Vol. I, II) Russian translation of 1968/1970, Nauka Publ., Moscow
- 2001/2003 (Vol. I, II) French translation, L’Harmattan, Paris
- 2011/2013 (Parts A and B of Vol. I, prefaces and sections 1-5) English translation of 1968 and 1934, bilingual with German facsimile on the left-hand sides.
- The Hilbert Bernays Project is producing an English translation.

== See also ==
- Hilbert–Bernays paradox
