= Cohn-Vossen's inequality =

Relates the integral of Gaussian curvature of surfaces to the Euler characteristic

In differential geometry, Cohn-Vossen's inequality, named after Stefan Cohn-Vossen, relates the integral of Gaussian curvature of a non-compact surface to the Euler characteristic. It is akin to the Gauss–Bonnet theorem for a compact surface.

A divergent path within a Riemannian manifold is a smooth curve in the manifold that is not contained within any compact subset of the manifold. A complete manifold is one in which every divergent path has infinite length with respect to the Riemannian metric on the manifold. Cohn-Vossen's inequality states that in every complete Riemannian 2-manifold S with finite total curvature and finite Euler characteristic, we have

$$\iint_S K \, dA \le 2\pi\chi(S),$$

where K is the Gaussian curvature, dA is the element of area, and χ is the Euler characteristic.

== Examples ==
- If S is a compact surface (without boundary), then the inequality is an equality by the usual Gauss–Bonnet theorem for compact manifolds.
- If S has a boundary, then the Gauss–Bonnet theorem gives

$$\iint_S K\, dA = 2\pi\chi(S) - \int_{\partial S}k_g\,ds$$

where $k_g$ is the geodesic curvature of the boundary, and its integral the total curvature which is necessarily positive for a boundary curve, and the inequality is strict. (A similar result holds when the boundary of S is piecewise smooth.)

- If S is the plane R^{2}, then the curvature of S is zero, and χ(S) = 1, so the inequality is strict: 0 < 2π.

== Notes and references ==
- Cohn-Vossen, Stefan (1935). "Kürzeste Wege und Totalkrümmung auf Flächen". Compositio Mathematica. 2: 69–13. JFM 61.0789.01. MR 1556908. Zbl 0011.22501.
- Huber, Alfred (1957). "On subharmonic functions and differential geometry in the large". Commentarii Mathematici Helvetici. 32 (1): 13–72. doi:10.1007/BF02564570. hdl:2027/mdp.39015095254580. MR 0094452. Zbl 0080.15001.
- Li, Peter (2000). "Curvature and function theory on Riemannian manifolds". In Yau, S.-T. (ed.). Surveys in Differential Geometry. Vol. 7. Somerville, MA: International Press. pp. 375–432. doi:10.4310/SDG.2002.v7.n1.a13. ISBN 1-57146-069-1. MR 1919432. Zbl 1066.53084.
- Shiohama, Katsuhiro; Shioya, Takashi; Tanaka, Minoru (2003). The geometry of total curvature on complete open surfaces. Cambridge Tracts in Mathematics. Vol. 159. Cambridge: Cambridge University Press. doi:10.1017/CBO9780511543159. ISBN 0-521-45054-3. MR 2028047. Zbl 1086.53056.
