= Otto Blumenthal =

German-Jewish mathematician (1876–1944)

Ludwig Otto Blumenthal
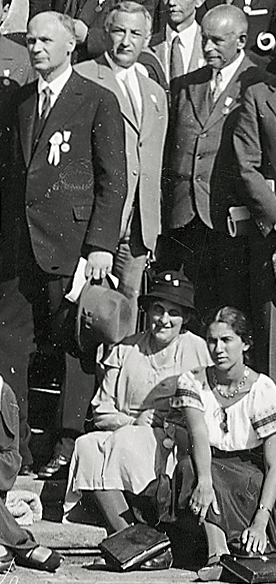
- Left to right, standing: Michel Plancherel, Prof. Karl Goldziher (Budapest), Otto Blumenthal, sitting: Ms. Blumenthal, and an unknown woman, at the International Mathematical Congress, Zürich 1932
- Born: 20 July 1876; Frankfurt, Hesse-Nassau
- Died: 12 November 1944 (aged 68); Theresienstadt concentration camp, Czechoslovakia
- Education: Göttingen University
- Known for: Editor of Mathematische Annalen, 1906-1938
- Spouse: Mali Ebstein
- Children: Margrete (born 1911), Ernst (born 1914)
- Scientific career
- Thesis: Über die Entwicklung einer willkürlichen Funktion nach den Nennern des Kettenbruches $\scriptstyle \int_{-\infty}^0 (z - \xi)^{-1} \varphi(\xi) d\xi$ (1898)
- Doctoral advisor: David Hilbert
- Doctoral students: Karl Gehlen

Ludwig Otto Blumenthal (20 July 1876 – 12 November 1944) was a German mathematician and professor at RWTH Aachen University.

== Biography ==
He was born in Frankfurt, Hesse-Nassau. A student of David Hilbert, Blumenthal was an editor of Mathematische Annalen. When the Civil Service Act of 1933 became law in 1933, after Hitler became Chancellor, Blumenthal was dismissed from his position at RWTH Aachen University. He was married to Amalie Ebstein, also known as 'Mali' and daughter of Wilhelm Ebstein.

Blumenthal, who was of Jewish background, emigrated from Nazi Germany to the Netherlands, lived in Utrecht and was deported via Westerbork to the concentration camp, Theresienstadt in Bohemia (now Czech Republic), where he died.

In 1913, Blumenthal made a fundamental, though often overlooked, contribution to applied mathematics and aerodynamics by building on Joukowsky's work to extract the complex transformation that carries the latter's name, making it an example of Stigler's Law.

== Selected publications ==
- Otto Blumenthal (1903). "Zum Eliminationsproblem bei analytischen Funktionen mehrerer Veränderlicher" (PDF). Math. Ann. 57 (3): 356–368. doi:10.1007/bf01444291. S2CID 120658586.
- Otto Blumenthal (1904). "Über Thetafunktionen und Modulfunktionen mehrerer Veränderlicher" (PDF). Jahresbericht der Deutschen Mathematiker-Vereinigung. 13: 126–138.
- Otto Blumenthal (1905). "Über die Zerlegung unendlicher Vektorfelder" (PDF). Math. Ann. 61 (2): 235–250. doi:10.1007/bf01457564. S2CID 123119260.
- Otto Blumenthal (1907). "Über ganze transzendente Funktionen" (PDF). Jahresbericht der Deutschen Mathematiker-Vereinigung. 16: 97–109.
- Otto Blumenthal (1916). "Einige Minimums-Sätze über trigonometrische und rationale Polynome" (PDF). Math. Ann. 77 (3): 390–403. doi:10.1007/bf01475868. S2CID 120474289.
- Otto Blumenthal (1931). "Über rationale Polynome mit einer Minimumseigenschaft" (PDF). Journal für die reine und angewandte Mathematik. 165: 237–246.
- Otto Blumenthal (1935). "Lebensgeschichte". Analysis — Grundlagen der Mathematik — Physik — Verschiedenes — Nebst einer Lebensgeschichte. David Hilbert — Gesammelte Abhandlungen. Vol. 3. Berlin: Julius Springer. pp. 388–429. Archived from the original on 6 March 2016.
- Otto Blumenthal (1935). "Zu den Entwicklungen nach Eigenfunktionen linearer symmetrischer Integralgleichungen" (PDF). Mathematische Annalen. 110: 726–733. doi:10.1007/bf01448053. S2CID 122625415.
