= Margarethe Kahn =

German mathematician (1880–1942)

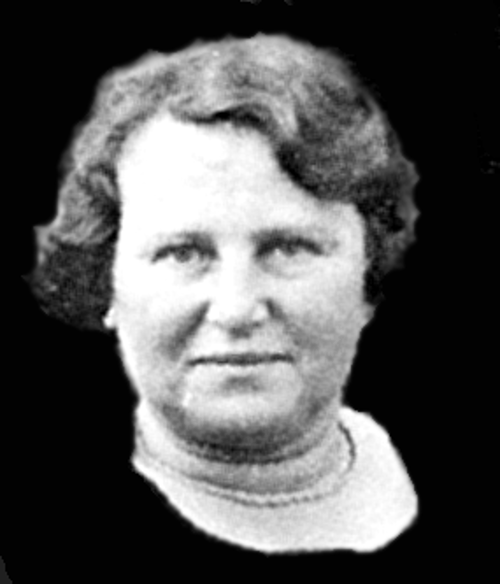
- Born: 27 August 1880; Eschwege, German Empire
- Died: 28 March 1942 (aged 61) (deported to Piaski on this date, and missing since then); Piaski, Poland
- Education: University of Göttingen
- Scientific career
- Fields: Mathematics (algebraic geometry)
- Thesis: Eine allgemeine Methode zur Untersuchung der Gestalten algebraischer Kurven [A general method for the study of the forms of algebraic curves] (1909)
- Doctoral advisor: David Hilbert
- Other academic advisors: Felix Klein

Margarethe Kahn (known as Grete Kahn, also Margarete Kahn, born 27 August 1880, missing after deportation to Piaski, Poland on 28 March 1942) was a German mathematician and Holocaust victim. She was among the first women to obtain a doctorate in Germany. Her doctoral work was on the topology of algebraic curves.

== Life and work ==
Margarethe Kahn was the daughter of Eschwege merchant and flannel factory owner Albert Kahn (1853–1905) and his wife Johanne (née Plaut, 1857–1882). She had an older brother Otto (1879–1932). Five years after the untimely death of his wife Johanne, their father married her younger sister Julie (1860–1934), with whom he had a daughter, Margarethe's half-sister Martha (1888–1942).

After attending elementary school from 1887, and the Higher School for Girls from 1889 to 1896, Kahn until 1904 took private lessons to prepare for her Abitur, because few high schools for girls existed at that time in Hesse, Germany. In 1904 she was given permission to take her Abitur at the Royal Gymnasium in Bad Hersfeld. Thus she belonged to the small elite of young women in Germany at the beginning of the 20th century who were allowed to take the Abitur externally at boys' schools. Konrad Duden signed her Abitur certificate as school principal.

Since Prussia began to allow women to formally attend university only from the winter semester of 1908–09, Kahn and her friend Klara Löbenstein first attended the universities of Berlin and Göttingen as guest students. In addition, Kahn attended lectures and tutorials in mathematics at the Technische Hochschule in Charlottenburg (now Technische Universität Berlin). They studied mathematics, physics, and propaedeutics at Berlin and Göttingen. At the University of Göttingen she attended lectures given by, among others, David Hilbert, Felix Klein, Woldemar Voigt, and Georg Elias Müller; in Berlin she attended lectures by Hermann Amandus Schwarz and Paul Drude at the Royal Prussian Academy of Sciences. Her field of expertise was algebraic geometry. Together with Löbenstein she made a contribution to Hilbert's sixteenth problem. Hilbert's sixteenth problem concerned the topology of algebraic curves in the complex projective plane; as a difficult special case in his formulation of the problem Hilbert proposed that there are no algebraic curves of degree 6 consisting of 11 separate ovals. Kahn and Löbenstein developed methods to address this problem.

Against opposition in particular from the Berlin faculty, but supported by the University of Göttingen and Felix Klein, Kahn obtained a doctorate in 1909 under David Hilbert in Göttingen, with a dissertation titled Eine allgemeine Methode zur Untersuchung der Gestalten algebraischer Kurven [A general method to investigate the shapes of algebraic curves] and was therefore one of the first German women to obtain a doctorate in mathematics (the mathematics division was part of the faculty of philosophy then). She took her oral examination – again, along with Löbenstein – on 30 June 1909.

Kahn could not pursue a scientific career because women in Germany were not admitted to habilitation before 1920. She therefore sought a career as a schoolteacher, and in October 1912 she obtained a job in the Prussian school system, where she worked as a teacher for secondary schools in Katowice, Dortmund, and from 1929 in Tegel at today's Gabriele-von-Bülow-Gymnasium, and later in Berlin-Pankow at today's Carl-von-Ossietzky-Gymnasium.

As a Jew, she was forced to go on leave by the Nazis in 1933, and was dismissed from the school in 1936. She was forced to work as a factory worker at the Nordland Schneeketten (Nordland snow chains) factory. On 28 March 1942, Kahn and her by then widowed sister Martha were deported to Piaski and are considered missing since then.

On 13 September 2008, a Stolperstein was laid at 127 Rudolstädter Straße in Wilmersdorf in memory of Margarethe Kahn, as well as on 26 May 2010 in front of her parents' former house at Stad 29 in Eschwege, where additionally a commemorative plaque was attached on 13 December 2017. In 2013, a street in Leverkusen was named after her.

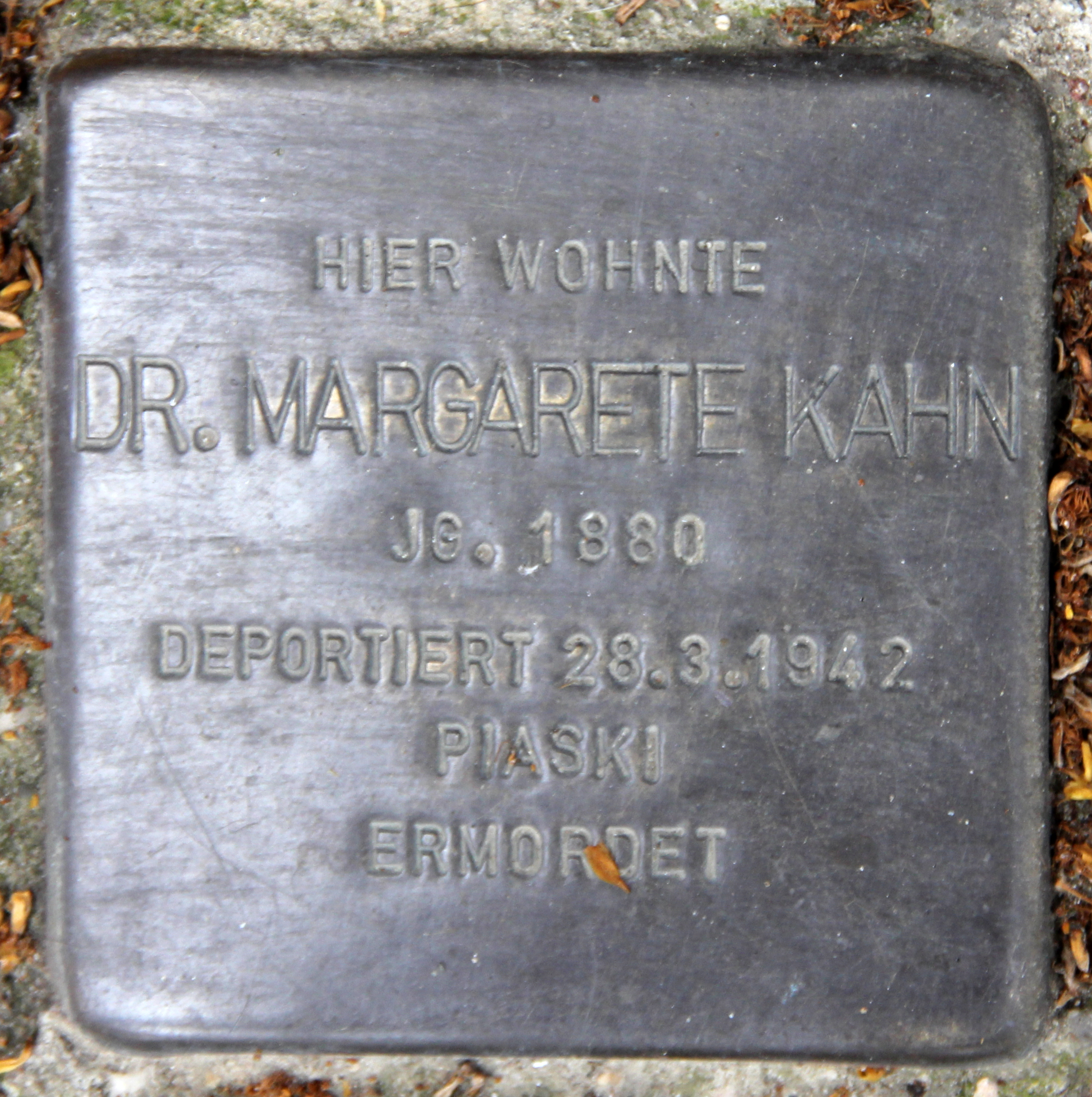
Stolperstein at 127 Rudolstädter Straße in Wilmersdorf, in memory of Margarethe Kahn

== Publications ==
- Kahn, Margarete (1909). "Eine allgemeine Methode zur Untersuchung der Gestalten algebraischer Kurven" [A general method for the study of the forms of algebraic curves]. Doctoral Dissertation, University of Göttingen (in German). Göttingen: W. Fr. Kaestner.
