= Hilbert field =

Hilbert field may refer to:

- The Hilbert field, the minimal ordered Pythagorean field
- A Hilbert field is one with minimal Kaplansky radical
- Hilbert class field, the maximal abelian unramified extension of a number field
- Hilbert–Speiser field, a field with a normal integral basis
- Hilbertian field, a field supporting a Hilbertian variety, one which is not "thin"
