= Hilbert's arithmetic of ends =

In mathematics, specifically in the area of hyperbolic geometry, Hilbert's arithmetic of ends is a method for endowing a geometric set, the set of ideal points or "ends" of a hyperbolic plane, with an algebraic structure as a field. It was introduced by German mathematician David Hilbert.

== Definitions ==
=== Ends ===
In a hyperbolic plane, one can define an ideal point or end to be an equivalence class of limiting parallel rays. The set of ends can then be topologized in a natural way and forms a circle. This usage of end is not canonical; in particular the concept it indicates is different from that of a topological end (see End (topology) and End (graph theory)).

In the Poincaré disk model or Klein model of hyperbolic geometry, every ray intersects the boundary circle (also called the circle at infinity or line at infinity) in a unique point, and the ends may be identified with these points. However, the points of the boundary circle are not considered to be points of the hyperbolic plane itself. Every hyperbolic line has exactly two distinct ends, and every two distinct ends are the ends of a unique line. For the purpose of Hilbert's arithmetic, it is expedient to denote a line by the ordered pair (a, b) of its ends.

Hilbert's arithmetic fixes arbitrarily three distinct ends, and labels them as 0, 1, and ∞. The set H on which Hilbert defines a field structure is the set of all ends other than ∞, while H' denotes the set of all ends including ∞.

=== Addition ===
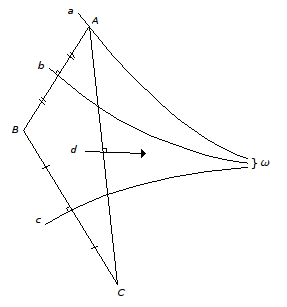
The composition of three reflections with the same end is a fourth reflection, also with the same end.

Hilbert defines the addition of ends using hyperbolic reflections. For every end x in H, its negation −x is defined by constructing the hyperbolic reflection of line (x,∞) across the line (0,∞), and choosing −x to be the end of the reflected line.

The composition of any three hyperbolic reflections whose axes of symmetry all share a common end is itself another reflection, across another line with the same end. Based on this "three reflections theorem", given any two ends x and y in H, Hilbert defines the sum x + y to be the non-infinite end of the symmetry axis of the composition of the three reflections through the lines (x,∞), (0,∞), and (y,∞).

It follows from the properties of reflections that these operations have the properties required of the negation and addition operations in the algebra of fields: they form the inverse and addition operations of an additive abelian group.

=== Multiplication ===
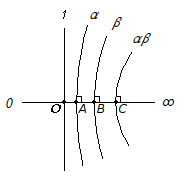
Multiplication over ends

The multiplication operation in the arithmetic of ends is defined (for nonzero elements x and y of H) by considering the lines (1,−1), (x,−x), and (y,−y). Because of the way −1, −x, and −y are defined by reflection across the line (0,∞), each of the three lines (1,−1), (x,−x), and (y,−y) is perpendicular to (0,∞).

From these three lines, a fourth line can be determined, the axis of symmetry of the composition of the reflections through (x,−x), (1,−1), and (y,−y). This line is also perpendicular to (0,∞), and so takes the form (z,−z) for some end z. Alternatively, the intersection of this line with the line (0,∞) can be found by adding the lengths of the line segments from the crossing with (1,−1) to the crossings of the other two points. For exactly one of the two possible choices for z, an even number of the four elements 1, x, y, and z lie on the same side of line (0,∞) as each other. The sum x + y is defined to be this choice of z.

Because it can be defined by adding lengths of line segments, this operation satisfies the requirement of a multiplication operation over a field, that it forms an abelian group over the nonzero elements of the field, with identity one. The inverse operation of the group is the reflection of an end across the line (1,−1). This multiplication operation can also be shown to obey the distributive property together with the addition operation of the field.

== Rigid motions ==
Let $\Pi$ be a hyperbolic plane and H its field of ends, as introduced above. In the plane $\Pi$, we have rigid motions and their effects on ends as follows:

- The reflection in $(0,\, \infty)$ sends $x\, \in\, H'$ to −x.

$$x'=-x.\,$$

- The reflection in (1, −1) gives,

$$x'={1 \over x}.\,$$

- Translation along $(0,\,\infty)$ that sends 1 to any $a\, \in\, H$, a > 0 is represented by

$$x'=ax.\,$$

- For any $a\, \in\, H$, there is a rigid motion σ_{(1/2)a} σ_{0}, the composition of reflection in the line $(0,\infty)$ and reflection in the line $((1/2) a,\, \infty)$, which is called rotation around $\infty$ is given by

$$x'=x+a.\,$$

- The rotation around the point O, which sends 0 to any given end $a\, \in\, H$, effects as

$$x'=\frac{x+a}{1-ax}$$

on ends. The rotation around O sending 0 to $\infty$ gives

$$x'=-{1 \over x}.$$

For a more extensive treatment than this article can give, confer.
