= Ugo Broggi =

Italian mathematician (1880–1965)

- Born: December 29, 1880; Como, Italy
- Died: November 23, 1965 (aged 84); Milan, Italy
- Education: University of Göttingen
- Scientific career
- Academic advisors: David Hilbert

Ugo Napoleone Giuseppe Broggi (December 29, 1880, Como – November 23, 1965, Milan) was an Italian actuary, mathematician, philosopher, statistician, and mathematical economist.

== Education and career ==
Broggi studied in Italy and Germany, graduating in actuarial science in 1902 and in economic science in 1904.

In 1906 Hoepli Editore published Broggi's book Matematica Attuariale, which was translated into French as Traité des Assurances de la Vie (Hermann, 1907) and into German as Versicherungsmathematik (Teubner, 1911).

In 1907 he obtained his doctorate, with advisor David Hilbert, from the University of Göttingen with a thesis entitled "Die Axiome der Wahrscheinlichkeitsrechnung" (The axioms of probability theory). Hilbert in his 1899 book Grundlagen der Geometrie (GdG) gave axioms for a modern treatment of Euclidean geometry. Influenced by GdG, Georg Bohlmann in 1901 gave axioms for probability theory. In 1904 at the University of Zürich, Rudolf Laemmel (1879–1962) published a doctoral dissertation Ermittlung von Wahrsheinlichkeiten, dealing with the axioms of probability. In 1905 Hilbert gave lectures on axiomatized probability theory based upon Bohlmann's work.

In 1907, however, one of Hilbert's doctoral students, Ugo Broggi (1880–1965), took up once more the issue of the axiomatization of the calculus of probability, attempting to perfect—following the guidelines established in GdG—the earlier proposals of Bohlmann and Laemmel. ... Based on Lebesgue's theory of measure, Broggi not only formulated a systems of axioms for probability, but also showed that his axioms were complete (in Hilbert's sense), independent and consistent, thus demonstrating the shortcomings of Bohlmann's earlier system.

In 1907 Broggi received not only a doctorate in mathematics but also a doctorate in philosophy. Broggi's 1909 paper on relativity "accurately discussed contemporary ideas on matter, radiation and time."

In 1910 Broggi moved to Argentina to become a professor of financial mathematics. At the National University of La Plata (NULP) he was appointed in 1911 professor of mathematical analysis and in 1912 professor of higher mathematics. In June 1912 the University of Buenos Aires (UBA) appointed him full professor of statistics. In November 1913 UBA's (newly created) Faculty of Economic Sciences (FES) appointed him to the FES council for a term of six years. In 1922 the FES council appointed him professor of financial mathematics. For the academic year 1925–1926 Broggi was on academic leave in Europe. In 1927 he gave some mathematical lectures in Rosario. At the end of 1927 he decided to return to Europe. In March 1928 he resigned his professorial chairs.

Ugo Broggi was one of the founders of modern mathematics and statistics in Argentina, and also produced valuable contributions in mathematical economics, such as proofs of existence of the utility function and the criticism to current proofs of existence in general equilibrium.

In 1928 he was invited speaker at the International Congress of Mathematicians in Bologna.

Broggi was a book reviewer for Rivista di Scienza. For 20 years he was on the editorial board of the Giornale degli economisti e Annali di economia. He was also an editor for several other journals, including the Bollettino dell'associazione degli attuari italiani (Bulletin of the association of Italian actuaries) and the Rendiconti del Circolo Matematico di Palermo.

After the end of WW II, Broggi returned to Buenos Aires for a brief visit, during which his former students held a party in his honor.

== Selected publications ==
- Matematica attuariale - Teoria statistica della mortalità. Matematica delle assicurazioni sulla vita, Hoepli, Milano, 1906
- Die Axiome der Wahrscheinlichkeitsrechnung, Inaugural-Dissertation zur Erlangung der Doktorwürde der hohen philosophischen Fakultät der Georg-Augusts-Universität zu Göttingen vorgelegt von Ugo Broggi, Göttingen, Druck der Dieterichschen Universitäts-Buchdruckerei, 1907
- Sur le principe de la moyenne arithmetique, Paris, Gauthier Villars, 1909
- Versicherungsmathematik: deutsche Ausgab, Leipzig Druck und Verlag, 1911
- Analisis matematico: vol. I - Las nociones fundamentales, La Plata, 1919
- Analisis matematico: vol. II - Teorias generales, funciones de mas de una variable, La Plata, 1927
