= Stefan Cohn-Vossen =

Russian mathematician

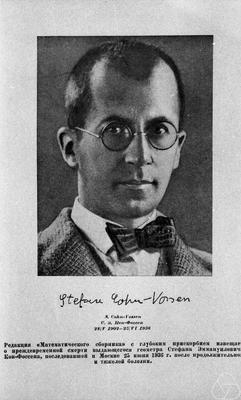
- in Moscow, probably 1936
- Born: 28 May 1902; Breslau, Silesia
- Died: 25 June 1936 (aged 34); Moscow, Soviet Union
- Education: Wrocław University
- Known for: Cohn-Vossen's inequality
- Scientific career
- Fields: Mathematics
- Thesis: Singuläre Punkte reeller, schlichter Kurvenscharen, deren Differentialgleichung gegeben ist (1924)
- Doctoral advisor: Adolf Kneser

Stefan Cohn-Vossen (28 May 1902 – 25 June 1936) was a mathematician, specializing in differential geometry. He is best known for his collaboration with David Hilbert on the 1932 book Anschauliche Geometrie, translated into English as Geometry and the Imagination. Both Cohn-Vossen's inequality and the Cohn-Vossen transformation are named after him. He also proved the first version of the splitting theorem.

== Biography ==
Stefan Cohn-Vossen was born 28 May, 1902 to Emanuel Cohn, a lawyer, and Hedwig (née Vossen) in Breslau (then a city in the Kingdom of Prussia; now Wrocław in Poland). He attended Göttingen in 1920; his notes from Hilbert's lectures on geometry at that time would form the basis for Anschauliche Geometrie. He wrote a 1924 doctoral dissertation at the University of Breslau (now the University of Wrocław) under the supervision of Adolf Kneser. In 1929 he completed his habilitation at Göttingen with his thesis Non-rigid closed surfaces under Richard Courant.

Cohn-Vossen became a professor at the University of Cologne in 1930. In 1931, Cohn-Vossen married Dr. Margot Maria Elfriede Ranft. Anschauliche Geometrie was published in 1932; the book was well reviewed and by association with Hilbert, Cohn-Vossen became well known. He was barred from lecturing in 1933 under Nazi racial legislation, because he was Jewish.

Unable to work in Germany, Cohn-Vossen moved to Switzerland in 1934, first to Locarno and then to Zurich, where he taught gymnasium. His son, Richard Cohn-Vossen, was born in Zurich in September 1934. Both Courant and Karl Löwner recommended Cohn-Vossen for positions abroad, at Istanbul and Dartmouth respectively; ultimately he emigrated to the USSR, with support from Herman Müntz, Fritz Houtermans, Pavel Alexandrov, and Heinz Hopf, where he was appointed to the Academy of Sciences and worked at Leningrad State University and the Steklov Institute.

Cohn-Vossen died in Moscow from pneumonia in 1936. Despite his short time in the USSR, Cohn-Vossen had a significant impact on the development of differential geometry "in the large" in Soviet mathematics.

Following Cohn-Vossen's death, his widow, Dr. Elfriede Cohn-Vossen, remarried Alfred Kurella, returned to Germany in 1954, and died in 1957. His son, Richard, became a filmmaker. In 1946, unaware of his death, the University of Cologne offered Cohn-Vossen his professorship back.

== Publications ==
=== Books ===
- Hilbert, David; Cohn-Vossen, Stefan (1932). Anschauliche Geometrie [Geometry and the Imagination] (in German). Berlin: Springer.
- Cohn-Vossen, S. E. (Кон-Фоссен С. Э.) (1959). Некоторые вопросы дифференциальной геометрии в целом [Some Problems of Differential Geometry in the Large] (in Russian). Moscow: Fizmatgiz.

=== Articles ===
- Cohn-Vossen, Stephan (1927). "Singularitäten konvexer Flächen" [Singularities of convex surfaces]. Math. Ann. (in German). 97: 377–386. doi:10.1007/BF01447873.
- Cohn-Vossen, Stefan (1927). "Zwei Sätze über die Starrheit der Eiflachen" [Two theorems on the rigidity of the ellipsoid]. Nach. Gesellschaft Wiss. Gottingen, Math. Phys. Kl. (in German): 125–134.
- Cohn-Vossen, Stefan (1928). "Die parabolische Kurve. Beitrag zur Geometrie der Berührungstransformationen, der partiellen Differentialgleichung zweiter Ordnung und der Flächenverbiegung". Math. Ann. 99: 273–308. doi:10.1007/BF01459097.
- Cohn-Vossen, Stefan (1930). "Unstarre geschlossene Flächen" [Non-rigid closed surfaces]. Math. Ann. (in German). 102: 10–29. doi:10.1007/BF01782336.
- Cohn-Vossen, Stefan (1933). "Sur la courbure totale des surfaces ouvertes". C. R. Acad. Sci. Paris (in French). 197: 1165–1167.
- Cohn-Vossen, Stefan (1935). "Kürzeste Wege und Totalkrümmung auf Flächen" [Shortest paths and total curvature on surfaces]. Compositio Mathematica (in German). 2: 69–133.
- Cohn-Vossen, Stefan (1935). "Totalkrümmung und geodätische Linien auf einfachzusammenhängenden offenen vollständigen Flächenstücken" [Total curvature and geodesics on simply connected open patches]. Mat. Sbornik (in German). 43 (2): 139–164.
- Cohn-Vossen, Stefan (1936). "Der approximative Sinussatz für kleine Dreiecke auf krummen Flächen (Auszug aus einem Brief an Prof. T. Levi-Civita)" [The approximate sine rule for small triangles on curved surfaces]. Compositio Mathematica (in German). 3: 52–54.
- Cohn-Vossen, Stefan (1936). "Existenz kürzester Wege" [The existence of shortest paths]. Compositio Mathematica (in German). 3: 441–452.
- Cohn-Vossen, Stephan (1938). "Die Kollineationen desn-dimensionalen Raumes" [Collineations of n-dimensional space]. Math. Ann. (in German). 115: 80–86. doi:10.1007/BF01448928.

== See also ==
- Cohn-Vossen's inequality
