= Manipulability ellipsoid =

Graphical representation of the ease with which a robotic arm can move its end effector

In robot kinematics, the manipulability ellipsoid represents the manipulability of a robotic system in a graphical form. Here, the manipulability of a robot arm refers to its ability to alter the position of the end effector based on the joint configuration. A higher manipulability measure signifies a broader range of potential movements in that specific configuration. When the robot is in a singular configuration the manipulability measure diminishes to zero.

== Definition ==
The manipulability ellipsoid is defined as the set

$\{ \xi : \xi^\operatorname{T} (J(q) J^\operatorname{T}(q))^{-1} \xi \le 1 \}$

where q is the joint configuration of the robot and J is the robot Jacobian relating the end-effector velocity with the joint rates.

== Geometric Interpretation ==
A geometric interpretation of the manipulability ellipsoid is that it includes all possible end-effector velocities normalized for a unit input at a given robot configuration. The axis of the ellipsoid can be computed by using the singular value decomposition of the robot Jacobian.
