= Klara Löbenstein =

German mathematician (1883–1968)

- Born: 15 February 1883; Hildesheim, German Empire
- Died: 10 June 1968 (aged 85); Buenos Aires, Argentina
- Resting place: Buenos Aires, Argentina
- Citizenship: German
- Education: University of Göttingen
- Scientific career
- Fields: Mathematics (algebraic geometry)
- Thesis: Über den Satz, daß eine ebene, algebraische Kurve 6. Ordnung mit 11 sich einander ausschließenden Ovalen nicht existiert [On the proposition that no plane algebraic curve of degree 6 with 11 mutually exclusive ovals exists] (1910)
- Doctoral advisor: David Hilbert

Klara Löbenstein (15 February 1883 – 10 June 1968) was a German mathematician. She was among the first women to obtain a doctorate in Germany. Her doctoral work was on the topology of algebraic curves.

== Life and work ==
Löbenstein was born in Hildesheim, Prussia on 15 February 1883 to merchant Lehmann Löbenstein and his wife Sofie (née Schönfeld).

In 1904, Löbenstein was given permission to take her Abitur at the Realgymnasium I Gymnasium in Hanover. Thus she belonged to a small group of talented young women in Germany at the beginning of the 20th century who were allowed to take the Abitur externally at boys' schools.

Since Prussia began to allow women to formally attend university only from the winter semester of 1908–09, Löbenstein and her friend Margarete Kahn first attended the universities of Berlin and Göttingen as guest students. They studied mathematics, physics, and propaedeutics at Berlin and Göttingen. Löbenstein's field of expertise was algebraic geometry. Together with Kahn she made a contribution to Hilbert's sixteenth problem. Hilbert's sixteenth problem concerned the topology of algebraic curves in the complex projective plane; as a difficult special case in his formulation of the problem Hilbert proposed that there are no algebraic curves of degree 6 consisting of 11 separate ovals. Löbenstein and Kahn developed methods to address this problem.

Löbenstein obtained a doctorate in 1910 under David Hilbert in Göttingen, with a dissertation titled Über den Satz, daß eine ebene, algebraische Kurve 6. Ordnung mit 11 sich einander ausschließenden Ovalen nicht existiert [On the proposition that no plane algebraic curve of degree 6 with 11 mutually exclusive ovals exists], and was therefore one of the first German women to obtain a doctorate in mathematics (the mathematics division was part of the faculty of philosophy then). She took her oral examination – again, along with Kahn – on 30 June 1909. Afterwards Löbenstein worked as a high school teacher in Metz and Landsberg. She was dismissed on 1 January 1936 due to the Nazi racial laws. In 1941 she emigrated to Argentina. She died on 10 June 1968 in Buenos Aires, where she rests in the Cementerio alemán.

== Publications ==
- Löbenstein, Klara (1910). "Über den Satz, daß eine ebene, algebraische Kurve 6. Ordnung mit 11 sich einander ausschließenden Ovalen nicht existiert" [On the proposition that no plane algebraic curve of degree 6 with 11 mutually exclusive ovals exists]. Doctoral dissertation, University of Göttingen (in German).
