= Hilbert algebra =

In mathematics, Hilbert algebras and left Hilbert algebras occur in the theory of von Neumann algebras in:

- Commutation theorem for traces § Hilbert algebras
- Tomita–Takesaki theory#Left Hilbert algebras
