= Geometry and the Imagination =

1932 book by David Hilbert and Stefan Cohn-Vossen

- Original title: Anschauliche Geometrie
- Translator: Paul Neményi
- Publisher: Chelsea Publishing (American Mathematical Society)
- Publication date: 1952
- Pages: 357
- ISBN: 9780821819982
- OCLC: 542459

Geometry and the Imagination is the English translation of the 1932 book Anschauliche Geometrie by David Hilbert and Stefan Cohn-Vossen.

The book was based on a series of lectures Hilbert made in the winter of 1920–21. The book is an attempt to present some then-current mathematical thought to "contribute to a more just appreciation of mathematics by a wider range of people than just the specialists." It differentiates between two tendencies in mathematics and any other scientific research: on the one hand, toward abstraction and logical relations, correlating the subject matter in a systematic and orderly manner, and on the other hand an intuitive approach, which moves toward a more immediate grasp of and a "live rapport" with the same material. Further he asserts that intuitive understanding actually plays a major role for the researcher as well as anyone who wishes to study and appreciate Geometry.

== Contents ==
Topics covered by the chapters in the book include the Leibniz formula for π, configurations of points and lines with equally many points on each line and equally many lines through each point, curvature and non-Euclidean geometry, mechanical linkages, the classification of manifolds by their Euler characteristic, and the four color theorem.

== Response ==
The Mathematical Association of America said about the book, "this book is a masterpiece — a delightful classic that should never go out of print". Physics Today called it "a readable exposition of modern geometry and its relation to other branches of mathematics". The Scientific Monthly said about it "has been a classic for twenty years . . . Although it deals with elementary topics, it reaches the fringe of our knowledge in many directions".
