= David Hilbert =

German mathematician (1862–1943)

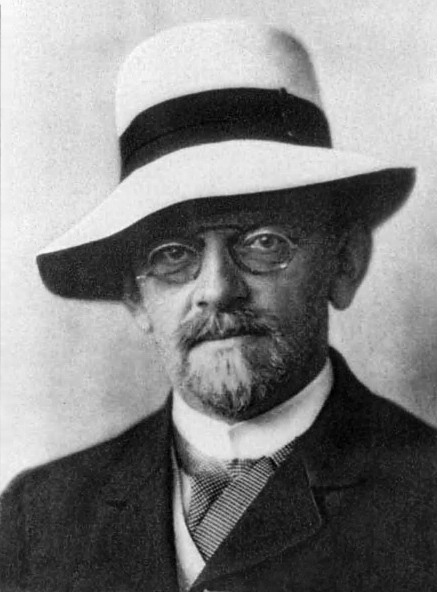
- Hilbert in 1912
- Born: 23 January 1862; Königsberg or Wehlau, Kingdom of Prussia
- Died: 14 February 1943 (aged 81); Göttingen, Nazi Germany
- Education: University of Königsberg (PhD)
- Known for: Hilbert's basis theorem Hilbert's Nullstellensatz; Hilbert's axioms Hilbert's problems Hilbert's program Einstein–Hilbert action Hilbert space Hilbert system Epsilon calculus
- Spouse: Käthe Jerosch
- Children: Franz (b. 1893)
- Awards: Lobachevsky Prize (1903); Bolyai Prize (1910); ForMemRS (1928)
- Scientific career
- Fields: Mathematics, physics, philosophy
- Workplaces: University of Königsberg; Göttingen University
- Thesis: On Invariant Properties of Special Binary Forms, Especially of Spherical Functions (1885)
- Doctoral advisor: Ferdinand von Lindemann
- Doctoral students: Wilhelm Ackermann; Heinrich Behmann; Felix Bernstein; Otto Blumenthal; Anne Bosworth; Werner Boy; Ugo Broggi; Richard Courant; Haskell Curry; Max Dehn; Ludwig Föppl; Rudolf Fueter; Paul Funk; Kurt Grelling; Alfréd Haar; Erich Hecke; Earle Hedrick; Ernst Hellinger; Wallie Hurwitz; Margarete Kahn; Oliver Kellogg; Hellmuth Kneser; Robert König; Emanuel Lasker; Klara Löbenstein; Charles Max Mason; Alexander Myller; Erhard Schmidt; Kurt Schütte; Andreas Speiser; Hugo Steinhaus; Gabriel Sudan; Teiji Takagi; Hermann Weyl; Lyubov Zapolskaya; Ernst Zermelo
- Other notable students: Edward Kasner; John von Neumann; Emanuel Lasker; Carl Gustav Hempel

David Hilbert (/ˈhɪlbərt/; German: [ˈdaːvɪt ˈhɪlbɐt]; 23 January 1862 – 14 February 1943) was a German mathematician and philosopher of mathematics. He is one of the most influential mathematicians of all time.

Hilbert discovered and developed a broad range of fundamental ideas including invariant theory, the calculus of variations, commutative algebra, algebraic number theory, the foundations of geometry, spectral theory of operators and its application to integral equations, mathematical physics, and the foundations of mathematics (particularly proof theory). He adopted and defended Georg Cantor's set theory and transfinite numbers. In 1900, he presented a collection of problems that set a course for mathematical research of the 20th century.

Hilbert and his students contributed to establishing rigor and developed important tools used in modern mathematical physics. He was a co-founder of proof theory and mathematical logic.

== Life ==
=== Early life and education ===
Hilbert, the first of two children and only son of Otto, a county judge, and Maria Therese Hilbert (née Erdtmann), the daughter of a merchant, was born in the Province of Prussia, Kingdom of Prussia, either in Königsberg, now Kaliningrad, (according to Hilbert's own statement) or in Wehlau (known since 1946 as Znamensk) near Königsberg where his father worked at the time of his birth. His paternal grandfather was David Hilbert, a judge and Geheimrat. His mother Maria had an interest in philosophy, astronomy and prime numbers, while his father Otto taught him Prussian virtues. After his father became a city judge, the family moved to Königsberg. David's sister, Elise, was born when he was six. He began his schooling aged eight, two years later than the usual starting age.

In late 1872, Hilbert entered the Friedrichskolleg Gymnasium (Collegium fridericianum, the same school that Immanuel Kant had attended 140 years before); but, after an unhappy period, he transferred to (late 1879) and graduated from (early 1880) the more science-oriented Wilhelm Gymnasium. Upon graduation, in autumn 1880, Hilbert enrolled at the University of Königsberg, the "Albertina". In early 1882, Hermann Minkowski (two years younger than Hilbert and also a native of Königsberg but had gone to Berlin for three semesters), returned to Königsberg and entered the university. Hilbert developed a lifelong friendship with the shy, gifted Minkowski.

=== Career ===
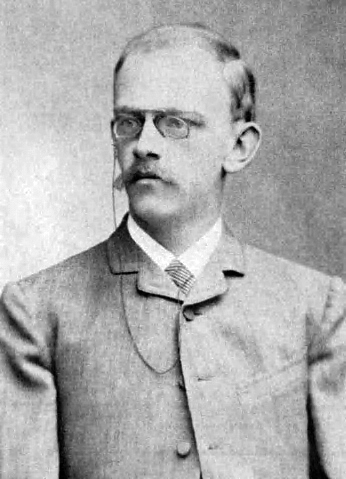
Hilbert in 1886

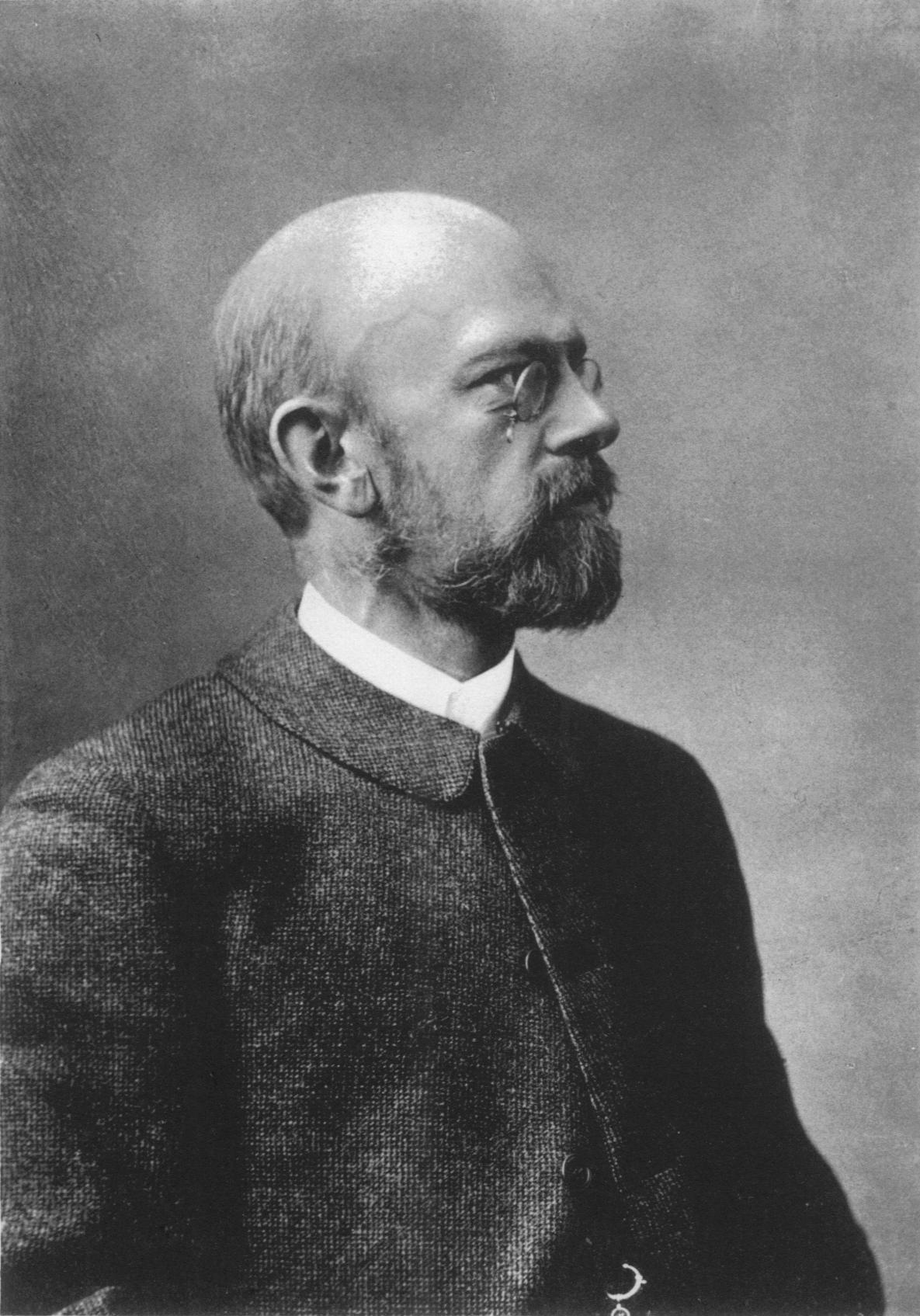
Hilbert in 1907

In 1884, Adolf Hurwitz arrived from Göttingen as an Extraordinarius (i.e., an associate professor). An intense and fruitful scientific exchange among the three began, and Minkowski and Hilbert especially would exercise a reciprocal influence over each other at various times in their scientific careers. Hilbert obtained his doctorate in 1885, with a dissertation, written under Ferdinand von Lindemann, titled Über invariante Eigenschaften spezieller binärer Formen, insbesondere der Kugelfunktionen ("On the invariant properties of special binary forms, in particular the spherical harmonic functions").

Hilbert remained at the University of Königsberg as a Privatdozent (senior lecturer) from 1886 to 1895. In 1895, as a result of intervention on his behalf by Felix Klein, he obtained the position of Professor of Mathematics at the University of Göttingen. During the Klein and Hilbert years, Göttingen became the preeminent institution in the mathematical world. He remained there for the rest of his life.

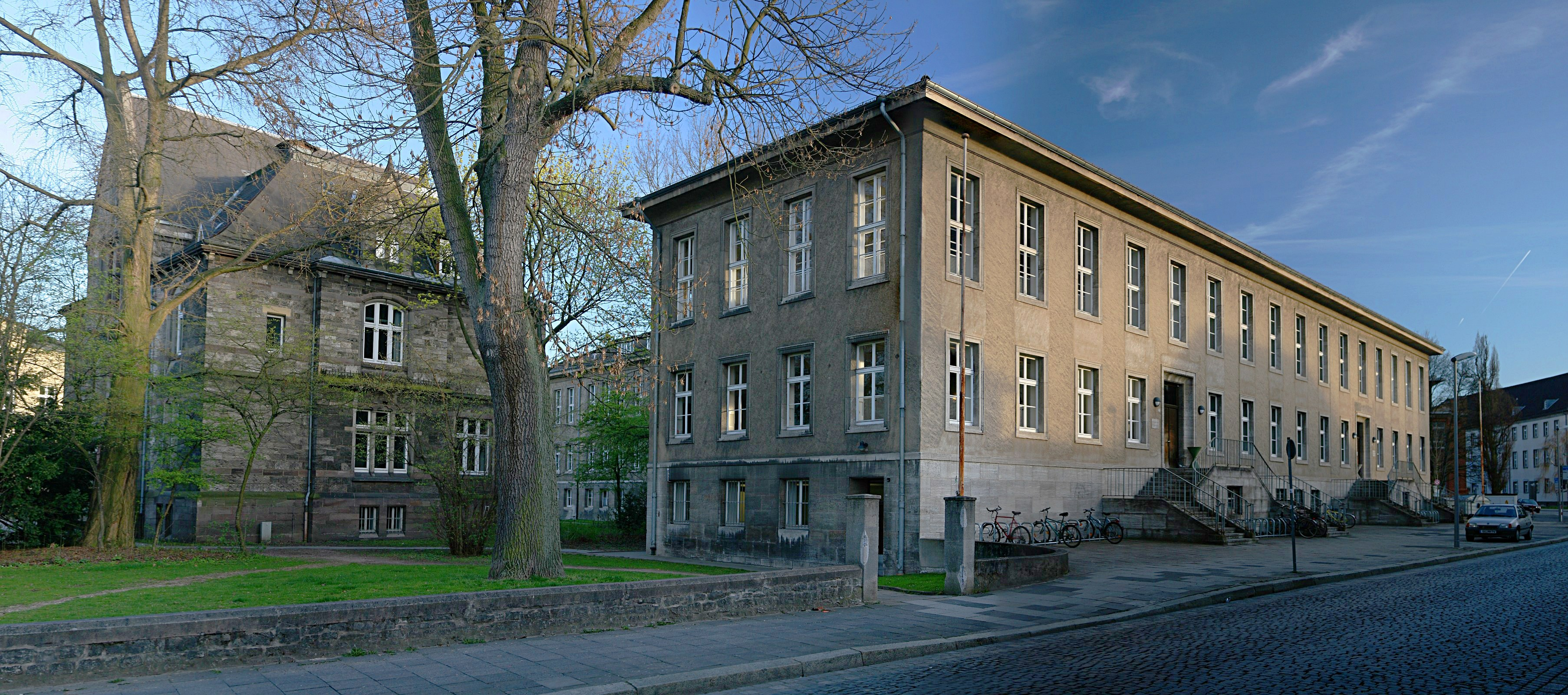
The Mathematical Institute in Göttingen. Its new building, constructed with funds from the Rockefeller Foundation, was opened by Hilbert and Courant in 1930.

=== Göttingen school ===
Among Hilbert's students were Hermann Weyl, chess champion Emanuel Lasker, Ernst Zermelo, and Carl Gustav Hempel. John von Neumann was his assistant. At the University of Göttingen, Hilbert was surrounded by a social circle of some of the most important mathematicians of the 20th century, such as Emmy Noether and Alonzo Church.

Among his 69 Ph.D. students in Göttingen were many who later became famous mathematicians, including (with date of thesis): Otto Blumenthal (1898), Felix Bernstein (1901), Hermann Weyl (1908), Richard Courant (1910), Erich Hecke (1910), Hugo Steinhaus (1911), and Wilhelm Ackermann (1925). Between 1902 and 1939 Hilbert was editor of the Mathematische Annalen, the leading mathematical journal of the time. He was elected an International Member of the United States National Academy of Sciences in 1907.

=== Personal life ===
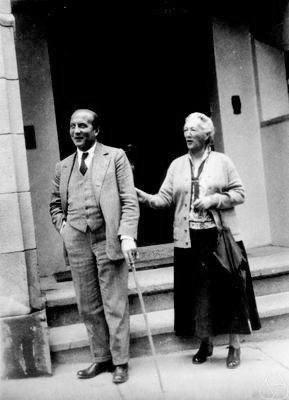
Käthe Hilbert with Constantin Carathéodory, before 1932

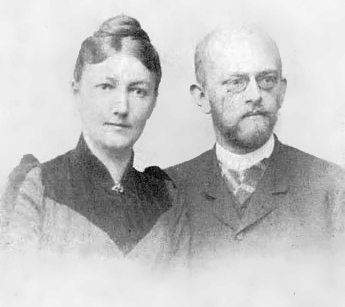
Hilbert and his wife Käthe Jerosch (1892)

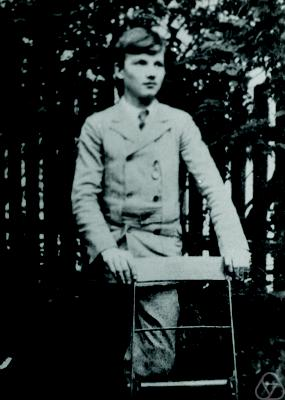
Franz Hilbert

In 1892, Hilbert married Käthe Jerosch (1864–1945), who was the daughter of a Königsberg merchant, "an outspoken young lady with an independence of mind that matched [Hilbert's]." While at Königsberg, they had their one child, Franz Hilbert (1893–1969). Franz suffered throughout his life from mental illness, and after he was admitted into a psychiatric clinic, Hilbert said, "From now on, I must consider myself as not having a son." His attitude toward Franz brought Käthe considerable sorrow.

Hilbert considered the mathematician Hermann Minkowski to be his "best and truest friend".

Hilbert was baptized and raised a Calvinist in the Prussian Evangelical Church. (Note: The Hilberts had, by this time, left the Calvinist Protestant church in which they had been baptized and married. – Reid 1996, p.91) He later left the Church and became an agnostic. (Note: David Hilbert seemed to be agnostic and had nothing to do with theology proper or even religion. Constance Reid tells a story on the subject: The Hilberts had by this time [around 1902] left the Reformed Protestant Church in which they had been baptized and married. It was told in Göttingen that when [David Hilbert's son] Franz had started to school he could not answer the question, "What religion are you?" (1970, p. 91) In the 1927 Hamburg address, Hilbert asserted: "mathematics is pre-suppositionless science (die Mathematik ist eine voraussetzungslose Wissenschaft)" and "to found it I do not need a good God ([z]u ihrer Begründung brauche ich weder den lieben Gott)" (1928, S. 85; van Heijenoort, 1967, p. 479). However, from Mathematische Probleme (1900) to Naturerkennen und Logik (1930) he placed his quasi-religious faith in the human spirit and in the power of pure thought with its beloved child– mathematics. He was deeply convinced that every mathematical problem could be solved by pure reason: in both mathematics and any part of natural science (through mathematics) there was "no ignorabimus" (Hilbert, 1900, S. 262; 1930, S. 963; Ewald, 1996, pp. 1102, 1165). That is why finding an inner absolute grounding for mathematics turned into Hilbert's life-work. He never gave up this position, and it is symbolic that his words "wir müssen wissen, wir werden wissen" ("we must know, we shall know") from his 1930 Königsberg address were engraved on his tombstone. Here, we meet a ghost of departed theology (to modify George Berkeley's words), for to absolutize human cognition means to identify it tacitly with a divine one. —Shaposhnikov, Vladislav (2016). "Theological Underpinnings of the Modern Philosophy of Mathematics. Part II: The Quest for Autonomous Foundations". Studies in Logic, Grammar and Rhetoric. 44 (1): 147–168. doi:10.1515/slgr-2016-0009.) He also argued that mathematical truth was independent of the existence of God or other a priori assumptions. (Note: "Mathematics is a presuppositionless science. To found it I do not need God, as does Kronecker, or the assumption of a special faculty of our understanding attuned to the principle of mathematical induction, as does Poincaré, or the primal intuition of Brouwer, or, finally, as do Russell and Whitehead, axioms of infinity, reducibility, or completeness, which in fact are actual, contentual assumptions that cannot be compensated for by consistency proofs." David Hilbert, Die Grundlagen der Mathematik, Hilbert's program, 22C:096, University of Iowa.) When Galileo Galilei was criticized for failing to stand up for his convictions on the Heliocentric theory, Hilbert objected: "But [Galileo] was not an idiot. Only an idiot could believe that scientific truth needs martyrdom; that may be necessary in religion, but scientific results prove themselves in due time."

=== Later years ===
Like Albert Einstein, Hilbert had closest contacts with the Berlin Group, whose leading founders had studied under Hilbert in Göttingen (Kurt Grelling, Hans Reichenbach, and Walter Dubislav).

Around 1925, Hilbert developed pernicious anemia, a then-untreatable vitamin deficiency of which the primary symptom is exhaustion; his assistant Eugene Wigner described him as subject to "enormous fatigue" and how he "seemed quite old", and that even after eventually being diagnosed and treated, he "was hardly a scientist after 1925, and certainly not a Hilbert".

Hilbert was elected to the American Philosophical Society in 1932.

Hilbert lived to see the Nazis purge many of the prominent faculty members at University of Göttingen in 1933. Those forced out included Hermann Weyl (who had taken Hilbert's chair when he retired in 1930), Emmy Noether, and Edmund Landau. One who had to leave Germany, Paul Bernays, had collaborated with Hilbert in mathematical logic, and co-authored with him the important book Grundlagen der Mathematik (which eventually appeared in two volumes, in 1934 and 1939). This was a sequel to the Hilbert–Ackermann book Principles of Mathematical Logic (1928). Hermann Weyl's successor was Helmut Hasse.

About a year after the purge, Hilbert attended a banquet and was seated next to the new Minister of Education, Bernhard Rust. Rust asked whether "the Mathematical Institute really suffered so much because of the departure of the Jews". Hilbert replied: "Suffered? It doesn't exist any longer, does it?"

=== Death ===
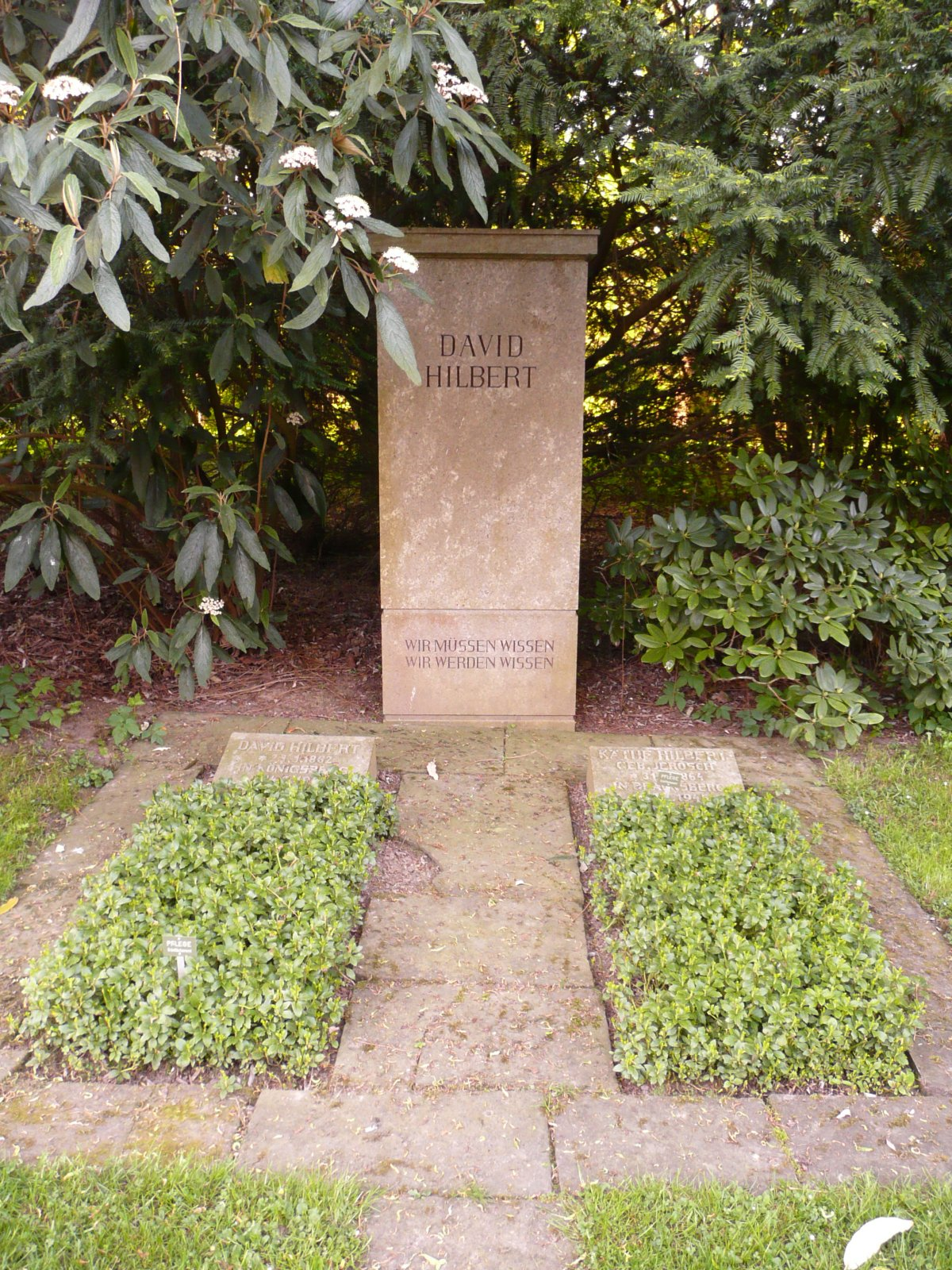
Hilbert's grave: Wir müssen wissen Wir werden wissen

By the time Hilbert died in 1943, the Nazis had nearly completely restaffed the university, as many of the former faculty had either been Jewish or married to Jews. Hilbert's funeral was attended by fewer than a dozen people, only two of whom were fellow academics, among them Arnold Sommerfeld, a theoretical physicist and also a native of Königsberg. News of his death only became known to the wider world several months after he died.

The epitaph on his tombstone in Göttingen consists of the famous lines he spoke at the conclusion of his retirement address to the Society of German Scientists and Physicians on 8 September 1930. The words were given in response to the Latin maxim: "Ignoramus et ignorabimus" or "We do not know and we shall not know":

Wir müssen wissen.
Wir werden wissen.

Translation:

We must know.
We shall know.

The day before Hilbert pronounced these phrases at the 1930 annual meeting of the Society of German Scientists and Physicians, Kurt Gödel—in a round table discussion during the Conference on Epistemology held jointly with the Society meetings—tentatively announced the first expression of his incompleteness theorem. (Note: "The Conference on Epistemology of the Exact Sciences ran for three days, from 5 to 7 September" (Dawson 1997:68). "It ... was held in conjunction with and just before the ninety-first annual meeting of the Society of German Scientists and Physicians ... and the sixth Assembly of German Physicists and Mathematicians.... Gödel's contributed talk took place on Saturday, 6 September [1930], from 3 until 3:20 in the afternoon, and on Sunday the meeting concluded with a round table discussion of the first day's addresses. During the latter event, without warning and almost offhandedly, Gödel quietly announced that "one can even give examples of propositions (and in fact of those of the type of Goldbach or Fermat) that, while contentually true, are unprovable in the formal system of classical mathematics [153]" (Dawson:69) "... As it happened, Hilbert himself was present at Königsberg, though apparently not at the Conference on Epistemology. The day after the roundtable discussion he delivered the opening address before the Society of German Scientists and Physicians – his famous lecture Naturerkennen und Logik (Logic and the knowledge of nature), at the end of which he declared: 'For the mathematician there is no Ignorabimus, and, in my opinion, not at all for natural science either. ... The true reason why [no-one] has succeeded in finding an unsolvable problem is, in my opinion, that there is no unsolvable problem. In contrast to the foolish Ignorabimus, our credo avers: We must know, We shall know [159]'"(Dawson:71). Gödel's paper was received on November 17, 1930 (cf Reid p. 197, van Heijenoort 1976:592) and published on 25 March 1931 (Dawson 1997:74). But Gödel had given a talk about it beforehand... "An abstract had been presented in October 1930 to the Vienna Academy of Sciences by Hans Hahn" (van Heijenoort:592); this abstract and the full paper both appear in van Heijenoort:583ff.) Gödel's incompleteness theorems show that even elementary axiomatic systems such as Peano arithmetic are either self-contradicting or contain logical propositions that are impossible to prove or disprove within that system.

== Contributions to mathematics and physics ==
=== Solving Gordan's Problem ===
Hilbert's first work on invariant functions led him to the demonstration in 1888 of his famous finiteness theorem. Twenty years earlier, Paul Gordan had demonstrated the theorem of the finiteness of generators for binary forms using a complex computational approach. Attempts to generalize his method to functions with more than two variables failed because of the enormous difficulty of the calculations involved. To solve what had become known in some circles as Gordan's Problem, Hilbert realized that it was necessary to take a completely different path. As a result, he demonstrated Hilbert's basis theorem, showing the existence of a finite set of generators, for the invariants of quantics in any number of variables, but in an abstract form. That is, while demonstrating the existence of such a set, it was not a constructive proof—it did not display "an object"—but rather, it was an existence proof and relied on use of the law of excluded middle in an infinite extension.

Hilbert sent his results to the Mathematische Annalen. Gordan, the house expert on the theory of invariants for the Mathematische Annalen, could not appreciate the revolutionary nature of Hilbert's theorem and rejected the article, criticizing the exposition because it was insufficiently comprehensive. His comment was:

Das ist nicht Mathematik. Das ist Theologie.

Translation:

This is not Mathematics. This is Theology.

Klein, on the other hand, recognized the importance of the work, and guaranteed that it would be published without any alterations. Encouraged by Klein, Hilbert extended his method in a second article, providing estimations on the maximum degree of the minimum set of generators, and he sent it once more to the Annalen. After having read the manuscript, Klein wrote to him, saying:

Without doubt this is the most important work on general algebra that the Annalen has ever published.

Later, after the usefulness of Hilbert's method was universally recognized, Gordan himself would say:

I have convinced myself that even theology has its merits.

For all his successes, the nature of his proof created more trouble than Hilbert could have imagined. Although Kronecker had conceded, Hilbert would later respond to others' similar criticisms that "many different constructions are subsumed under one fundamental idea"—in other words (to quote Reid): "Through a proof of existence, Hilbert had been able to obtain a construction"; "the proof" (i.e. the symbols on the page) was "the object". Not all were convinced. While Kronecker would die soon afterwards, his constructivist philosophy would continue with the young Brouwer and his developing intuitionist "school", much to Hilbert's torment in his later years. Indeed, Hilbert would lose his "gifted pupil" Weyl to intuitionism—"Hilbert was disturbed by his former student's fascination with the ideas of Brouwer, which aroused in Hilbert the memory of Kronecker". Brouwer the intuitionist in particular opposed the use of the Law of Excluded Middle over infinite sets (as Hilbert had used it). Hilbert responded:

Taking the Principle of the Excluded Middle from the mathematician ... is the same as ... prohibiting the boxer the use of his fists.

=== Nullstellensatz ===
In the subject of algebra, a field is called algebraically closed if and only if every polynomial over it has a root in it. Under this condition, Hilbert gave a criterion for when a collection of polynomials $(p_\lambda)_{\lambda \in \Lambda}$ of $n$ variables has a common root: This is the case if and only if there do not exist polynomials $q_1, \ldots, q_k$ and indices $\lambda_1, \ldots, \lambda_k$ such that

$$1 = \sum_{j=1}^k p_{\lambda_j}(\vec x) q_j(\vec x)$$.

This result is known as the Hilbert root theorem, or "Hilberts Nullstellensatz" in German. He also proved that the correspondence between vanishing ideals and their vanishing sets is bijective between affine varieties and radical ideals in $\C[x_1, \ldots, x_n]$.

=== Curve ===
The replacement rules

In March 1890, Giuseppe Peano had published an article in the Mathematische Annalen describing the historically first space-filling curve. In response, Hilbert designed his own construction of such a curve, which is now called the Hilbert curve. Approximations to this curve are constructed iteratively according to the replacement rules in the first picture of this section. The curve itself is then the pointwise limit.

The first six approximations to the Hilbert curve

=== Axiomatization of geometry ===
The text Grundlagen der Geometrie (tr.: Foundations of Geometry) published by Hilbert in 1899 proposes a formal set, called Hilbert's axioms, substituting for the traditional axioms of Euclid. They avoid weaknesses identified in those of Euclid, whose works at the time were still used textbook-fashion. It is difficult to specify the axioms used by Hilbert without referring to the publication history of the Grundlagen since Hilbert changed and modified them several times. The original monograph was quickly followed by a French translation, in which Hilbert added V.2, the Completeness Axiom. An English translation, authorized by Hilbert, was made by E.J. Townsend and copyrighted in 1902. This translation incorporated the changes made in the French translation and so is considered to be a translation of the 2nd edition. Hilbert continued to make changes in the text and several editions appeared in German. The 7th edition was the last to appear in Hilbert's lifetime. New editions followed the 7th, but the main text was essentially not revised. (Note: Independently and contemporaneously, a 19 year-old American student named Robert Lee Moore published an equivalent set of axioms. Some of the axioms coincide, while some of the axioms in Moore's system are theorems in Hilbert's and vice versa.)

Hilbert's approach signaled the shift to the modern axiomatic method. In this, Hilbert was anticipated by Moritz Pasch's work from 1882. Axioms are not taken as self-evident truths. Geometry may treat things, about which we have powerful intuitions, but it is not necessary to assign any explicit meaning to the undefined concepts. The elements, such as point, line, plane, and others, could be substituted, as Hilbert is reported to have said to Schoenflies and Kötter, by tables, chairs, glasses of beer and other such objects. It is their defined relationships that are discussed.

Hilbert first enumerates the undefined concepts: point, line, plane, lying on (a relation between points and lines, points and planes, and lines and planes), betweenness, congruence of pairs of points (line segments), and congruence of angles. The axioms unify both the plane geometry and solid geometry of Euclid in a single system.

=== 23 problems ===
Hilbert put forth a list of 23 unsolved problems at the International Congress of Mathematicians in Paris in 1900. This list, including the Riemann hypothesis, is generally reckoned as the most successful and deeply considered compilation of open problems ever to be produced by an individual mathematician.

After reworking the foundations of classical geometry, Hilbert could have extrapolated to the rest of mathematics. His approach differed from the later "foundationalist" Russell–Whitehead or "encyclopedist" Nicolas Bourbaki, and from his contemporary Giuseppe Peano. The mathematical community as a whole could engage in problems of which he had identified as crucial aspects of important areas of mathematics.

The problem set was launched as a talk, "The Problems of Mathematics", presented during the course of the Second International Congress of Mathematicians, held in Paris. The introduction of the speech that Hilbert gave said:

Who of us would not be glad to lift the veil behind which the future lies hidden; to cast a glance at the next advances of our science and at the secrets of its development during future centuries ? What particular goals will there be toward which the leading mathematical spirits of coming generations will strive ? What new methods and new facts in the wide and rich field of mathematical thought will the new centuries disclose?

He presented fewer than half the problems at the Congress, which were published in the acts of the Congress. In a subsequent publication, he extended the panorama, and arrived at the formulation of the now-canonical 23 Problems of Hilbert (see also Hilbert's twenty-fourth problem). The full text is important, since the exegesis of the questions still can be a matter of debate when it is asked how many have been solved.

Some of these were solved within a short time. Others have been discussed throughout the 20th century, with a few now taken to be unsuitably open-ended to come to closure. Some continue to remain challenges.

The following are the headers for Hilbert's 23 problems as they appeared in the 1902 translation in the Bulletin of the American Mathematical Society.

1. Cantor's problem of the cardinal number of the continuum.
2. The compatibility of the arithmetical axioms.
3. The equality of the volumes of two tetrahedra of equal bases and equal altitudes.
4. Problem of the straight line as the shortest distance between two points.
5. Lie's concept of a continuous group of transformations without the assumption of the differentiability of the functions defining the group.
6. Mathematical treatment of the axioms of physics.
7. Irrationality and transcendence of certain numbers.
8. Problems of prime numbers (The "Riemann Hypothesis").
9. Proof of the most general law of reciprocity in any number field.
10. Determination of the solvability of a Diophantine equation.
11. Quadratic forms with any algebraic numerical coefficients
12. Extensions of Kronecker's theorem on Abelian fields to any algebraic realm of rationality
13. Impossibility of the solution of the general equation of 7th degree by means of functions of only two arguments.
14. Proof of the finiteness of certain complete systems of functions.
15. Rigorous foundation of Schubert's enumerative calculus.
16. Problem of the topology of algebraic curves and surfaces.
17. Expression of definite forms by squares.
18. Building up of space from congruent polyhedra.
19. Are the solutions of regular problems in the calculus of variations always necessarily analytic?
20. The general problem of boundary values (Boundary value problems in PDE's).
21. Proof of the existence of linear differential equations having a prescribed monodromy group.
22. Uniformization of analytic relations by means of automorphic functions.
23. Further development of the methods of the calculus of variations.

=== Formalism ===
In an account that had become standard by the mid-century, Hilbert's problem set was also a kind of manifesto that opened the way for the development of the formalist school, one of three major schools of mathematics of the 20th century. According to the formalist, mathematics is manipulation of symbols according to agreed upon formal rules. It is therefore an autonomous activity of thought.

==== Program ====
In 1920, Hilbert proposed a research project in metamathematics that became known as Hilbert's program. He wanted mathematics to be formulated on a solid and complete logical foundation. He believed that in principle this could be done by showing that:

1. all of mathematics follows from a correctly chosen finite system of axioms; and
2. that some such axiom system is provably consistent through some means such as the epsilon calculus.

He seems to have had both technical and philosophical reasons for formulating this proposal. It affirmed his dislike of what had become known as the ignorabimus, still an active issue in his time in German thought, and traced back in that formulation to Emil du Bois-Reymond.

This program is still recognizable in the most popular philosophy of mathematics, where it is usually called formalism. For example, the Bourbaki group adopted a watered-down and selective version of it as adequate to the requirements of their twin projects of (a) writing encyclopedic foundational works, and (b) supporting the axiomatic method as a research tool. This approach has been successful and influential in relation with Hilbert's work in algebra and functional analysis, but has failed to engage in the same way with his interests in physics and logic.

Hilbert wrote in 1919:

We are not speaking here of arbitrariness in any sense. Mathematics is not like a game whose tasks are determined by arbitrarily stipulated rules. Rather, it is a conceptual system possessing internal necessity that can only be so and by no means otherwise.

Hilbert published his views on the foundations of mathematics in the 2-volume work, Grundlagen der Mathematik.

==== Gödel's work ====
Hilbert and the mathematicians who worked with him in his enterprise were committed to the project. His attempt to support axiomatized mathematics with definitive principles, which could banish theoretical uncertainties, ended in failure.

Gödel demonstrated that any consistent formal system that is sufficiently powerful to express basic arithmetic cannot prove its own completeness using only its own axioms and rules of inference. In 1931, his incompleteness theorem showed that Hilbert's grand plan was impossible as stated. The second point cannot in any reasonable way be combined with the first point, as long as the axiom system is genuinely finitary.

Nevertheless, the subsequent achievements of proof theory at the very least clarified consistency as it relates to theories of central concern to mathematicians. Hilbert's work had started logic on this course of clarification; the need to understand Gödel's work then led to the development of recursion theory and then mathematical logic as an autonomous discipline in the 1930s. The basis for later theoretical computer science, in the work of Alonzo Church and Alan Turing, also grew directly out of this "debate".

=== Functional analysis ===
Around 1909, Hilbert dedicated himself to the study of differential and integral equations; his work had direct consequences for important parts of modern functional analysis. In order to carry out these studies, Hilbert introduced the concept of an infinite-dimensional Euclidean space, later called Hilbert space. His work in this part of analysis provided the basis for important contributions to the mathematics of physics in the next two decades, though from an unanticipated direction. Later on, Stefan Banach amplified the concept, defining Banach spaces. Hilbert spaces are an important class of objects in the area of functional analysis, particularly of the spectral theory of self-adjoint linear operators, that grew up around it during the 20th century.

=== Physics ===
Until 1912, Hilbert was almost exclusively a pure mathematician. When planning a visit from Bonn, where he was immersed in studying physics, his fellow mathematician and friend Hermann Minkowski joked he had to spend 10 days in quarantine before being able to visit Hilbert. In fact, Minkowski seems responsible for most of Hilbert's physics investigations prior to 1912, including their joint seminar on the subject in 1905.

In 1912, three years after his friend's death, Hilbert turned his focus to the subject almost exclusively. He arranged to have a "physics tutor" for himself. He started studying kinetic gas theory and moved on to elementary radiation theory and the molecular theory of matter. Even after the war started in 1914, he continued seminars and classes where the works of Albert Einstein and others were followed closely.

By 1907, Einstein had framed the fundamentals of the theory of gravity, but then struggled for nearly 8 years to put the theory into its final form. By early summer 1915, Hilbert's interest in physics had focused on general relativity, and he invited Einstein to Göttingen to deliver a week of lectures on the subject. Einstein received an enthusiastic reception at Göttingen. Over the summer, Einstein learned that Hilbert was also working on the field equations and redoubled his own efforts. During November 1915, Einstein published several papers culminating in The Field Equations of Gravitation (see Einstein field equations). (Note: In time, associating the gravitational field equations with Hilbert's name became less and less common. A noticeable exception is P. Jordan (Schwerkraft und Weltall, Braunschweig, Vieweg, 1952), who called the equations of gravitation in the vacuum the Einstein–Hilbert equations. (Leo Corry, David Hilbert and the Axiomatization of Physics, p. 437)) Nearly simultaneously, Hilbert published "The Foundations of Physics", an axiomatic derivation of the field equations (see Einstein–Hilbert action). Hilbert fully credited Einstein as the originator of the theory and no public priority dispute concerning the field equations ever arose between the two men during their lives. (Note: Since 1971 there have been some spirited and scholarly discussions about which of the two men first presented the now accepted form of the field equations. "Hilbert freely admitted, and frequently stated in lectures, that the great idea was Einstein's: "Every boy in the streets of Gottingen understands more about four dimensional geometry than Einstein," he once remarked. "Yet, in spite of that, Einstein did the work and not the mathematicians." (Reid 1996, pp. 141–142, also Isaacson 2007:222 quoting Thorne p. 119).)

Additionally, Hilbert's work anticipated and assisted several advances in the mathematical formulation of quantum mechanics. His work was a key aspect of Hermann Weyl and John von Neumann's work on the mathematical equivalence of Werner Heisenberg's matrix mechanics and Erwin Schrödinger's wave equation, and his namesake Hilbert space plays an important part in quantum theory. In 1926, von Neumann showed that, if quantum states were understood as vectors in Hilbert space, they would correspond with both Schrödinger's wave function theory and Heisenberg's matrices. (Note: In 1926, the year after the matrix mechanics formulation of quantum theory by Max Born and Werner Heisenberg, the mathematician John von Neumann became an assistant to Hilbert at Göttingen. When von Neumann left in 1932, von Neumann's book on the mathematical foundations of quantum mechanics, based on Hilbert's mathematics, was published under the title Mathematische Grundlagen der Quantenmechanik. See: Norman Macrae (1999) John von Neumann: The Scientific Genius Who Pioneered the Modern Computer, Game Theory, Nuclear Deterrence, and Much More (reprinted by the American Mathematical Society) and Reid (1996).)

Throughout this immersion in physics, Hilbert worked on putting rigor into the mathematics of physics. While highly dependent on higher mathematics, physicists tended to be "sloppy" with it. To a pure mathematician like Hilbert, this was both ugly and difficult to understand. As he began to understand physics and how physicists were using mathematics, he developed a coherent mathematical theory for what he found – most importantly in the area of integral equations. When his colleague Richard Courant wrote the now classic Methoden der mathematischen Physik (Methods of Mathematical Physics) including some of Hilbert's ideas, he added Hilbert's name as author even though Hilbert had not directly contributed to the writing. Hilbert said "Physics is too hard for physicists", implying that the necessary mathematics was generally beyond them; the Courant–Hilbert book made it easier for them.

=== Number theory ===
Hilbert unified the field of algebraic number theory with his 1897 treatise Zahlbericht (literally "report on numbers"). He also resolved a significant number-theory problem formulated by Waring in 1770. As with the finiteness theorem, he used an existence proof that shows there must be solutions for the problem rather than providing a mechanism to produce the answers. He then had little more to publish on the subject; but the emergence of Hilbert modular forms in the dissertation of a student means his name is further attached to a major area.

He made a series of conjectures on class field theory. The concepts were highly influential, and his own contribution lives on in the names of the Hilbert class field and of the Hilbert symbol of local class field theory. Results were mostly proved by 1930, after work by Teiji Takagi. (Note: This work established Takagi as Japan's first mathematician of international stature.)

Hilbert did not work in the central areas of analytic number theory, but his name has become known for the Hilbert–Pólya conjecture, for reasons that are anecdotal. Ernst Hellinger, a student of Hilbert, once told André Weil that Hilbert had announced in his seminar in the early 1900s that he expected the proof of the Riemann Hypothesis would be a consequence of Fredholm's work on integral equations with a symmetric kernel.

== Works ==
His collected works (Gesammelte Abhandlungen) have been published several times. The original versions of his papers contained "many technical errors of varying degree"; when the collection was first published, the errors were corrected and it was found that this could be done without major changes in the statements of the theorems, with one exception—a claimed proof of the continuum hypothesis. The errors were nonetheless so numerous and significant that it took Olga Taussky-Todd three years to make the corrections.

== See also ==
=== Concepts ===
- List of things named after David Hilbert
- Foundations of geometry
- Hilbert C*-module
- Hilbert cube
- Hilbert curve
- Hilbert matrix
- Hilbert metric
- Hilbert–Mumford criterion
- Hilbert number
- Hilbert ring
- Hilbert–Poincaré series
- Hilbert series and Hilbert polynomial
- Hilbert space
- Hilbert spectrum
- Hilbert system
- Hilbert transform
- Hilbert's arithmetic of ends
- Hilbert's paradox of the Grand Hotel
- Hilbert–Schmidt operator
- Hilbert–Smith conjecture

=== Theorems ===
- Hilbert–Burch theorem
- Hilbert's irreducibility theorem
- Hilbert's Nullstellensatz
- Hilbert's theorem (differential geometry)
- Hilbert's Theorem 90
- Hilbert's syzygy theorem
- Hilbert–Speiser theorem

=== Other ===
- Brouwer–Hilbert controversy
- Direct method in the calculus of variations
- Entscheidungsproblem
- Geometry and the Imagination
- General relativity priority dispute

== Sources ==
=== Primary literature in English translation ===
- Ewald, William B., ed. (1996). From Kant to Hilbert: A Source Book in the Foundations of Mathematics. Oxford, UK: Oxford University Press.
  - 1918. "Axiomatic thought," 1114–1115.
  - 1922. "The new grounding of mathematics: First report," 1115–1133.
  - 1923. "The logical foundations of mathematics," 1134–1147.
  - 1930. "Logic and the knowledge of nature," 1157–1165.
  - 1931. "The grounding of elementary number theory," 1148–1156.
  - 1904. "On the foundations of logic and arithmetic," 129–138.
  - 1925. "On the infinite," 367–392.
  - 1927. "The foundations of mathematics," with comment by Weyl and Appendix by Bernays, 464–489.
- van Heijenoort, Jean (1967). From Frege to Gödel: A source book in mathematical logic, 1879–1931. Harvard University Press.
- Hilbert, David (1950) [1902]. The Foundations of Geometry [Grundlagen der Geometrie] (PDF). Translated by Townsend, E.J. (2nd ed.). La Salle, IL: Open Court Publishing. Archived (PDF) from the original on 28 December 2005.
- Hilbert, David (1990) [1971]. Foundations of Geometry [Grundlagen der Geometrie]. Translated by Unger, Leo (2nd English ed.). La Salle, IL: Open Court Publishing. ISBN 978-0-87548-164-7. "translated from the 10th German edition"
- Hilbert, David; Cohn-Vossen, Stephan (1999). Geometry and Imagination. American Mathematical Society. ISBN 978-0-8218-1998-2. "An accessible set of lectures originally for the citizens of Göttingen."
- Hilbert, David (2004). Hallett, Michael; Majer, Ulrich (eds.). David Hilbert's Lectures on the Foundations of Mathematics and Physics, 1891–1933. Berlin & Heidelberg: Springer-Verlag. ISBN 978-3-540-64373-9.

=== Secondary literature ===
- Bertrand, Gabriel (20 December 1943b), "Allocution", Comptes rendus hebdomadaires des séances de l'Académie des sciences (in French), 217, Paris: 625–640, available at Gallica. The "Address" of Gabriel Bertrand of 20 December 1943 at the French Academy: he gives biographical sketches of the lives of recently deceased members, including Pieter Zeeman, David Hilbert and Georges Giraud.
- Bottazzini Umberto, 2003. Il flauto di Hilbert. Storia della matematica. UTET, ISBN 88-7750-852-3
- Corry, L., Renn, J., and Stachel, J., 1997, "Belated Decision in the Hilbert-Einstein Priority Dispute," Science 278: nn-nn.
- Corry, Leo (2004). David Hilbert and the Axiomatization of Physics (1898–1918): From Grundlagen der Geometrie to Grundlagen der Physik. Springer. ISBN 90-481-6719-1.
- Dawson, John W. Jr 1997. Logical Dilemmas: The Life and Work of Kurt Gödel. Wellesley MA: A. K. Peters. ISBN 1-56881-256-6.
- Fölsing, Albrecht (1998). Albert Einstein. Penguin.
- Grattan-Guinness, Ivor, 2000. The Search for Mathematical Roots 1870–1940. Princeton Univ. Press.
- Gray, Jeremy, 2000. The Hilbert Challenge. ISBN 0-19-850651-1
- Isaacson, Walter (2007). Einstein: His Life and Universe. New York: Simon & Schuster Paperbacks. ISBN 978-0-7432-6473-0.
- Mancosu, Paolo (1998). From Brouwer to Hilbert, The Debate on the Foundations of Mathematics in 1920s. Oxford Univ. Press. ISBN 978-0-19-509631-6.
- Mehra, Jagdish, 1974. Einstein, Hilbert, and the Theory of Gravitation. Reidel.
- Piergiorgio Odifreddi, 2003. Divertimento Geometrico. Le origini geometriche della logica da Euclide a Hilbert. Bollati Boringhieri, ISBN 88-339-5714-4. A clear exposition of the "errors" of Euclid and of the solutions presented in the Grundlagen der Geometrie, with reference to non-Euclidean geometry.
- Reid, Constance. (1996). Hilbert. New York: Springer. ISBN 0-387-94674-8. The definitive English-language biography of Hilbert.
- Rowe, D. E. (1989). "Klein, Hilbert, and the Gottingen Mathematical Tradition". Osiris. 5: 186–213. doi:10.1086/368687. S2CID 121068952.
- Sauer, Tilman (1999). "The Relativity of Discovery: Hilberts First Note on the Foundations of Physics". Archive for History of Exact Sciences. 53 (5): 529–575. arXiv:physics/9811050. Bibcode:1998physics..11050S. doi:10.1007/s004070050006.
- Sieg, Wilfried (2013). Hilbert's Programs and Beyond. Oxford University Press. ISBN 978-0-19-537222-9.
- Sieg, Wilfried, and Ravaglia, Mark, 2005, "Grundlagen der Mathematik" in Grattan-Guinness, I., ed., Landmark Writings in Western Mathematics. Elsevier: 981–99. (in English)
- Thorne, Kip, 1995. Black Holes and Time Warps: Einstein's Outrageous Legacy, W. W. Norton & Company; Reprint edition. ISBN 0-393-31276-3.
- Georg von Wallwitz: Meine Herren, dies ist keine Badeanstalt. Wie ein Mathematiker das 20. Jahrhundert veränderte. Berenberg Verlag, Berlin 2017, ISBN 978-3-946334-24-8. The definitive German-language biography of Hilbert.
