= List of things named after Georg Cantor =

This is a list of things named after Georg Cantor (1845–1918), a German mathematician.

== Mathematics ==
- Cantor algebra
- Cantor cube
- Cantor distribution
- Cantor function
- Cantor normal form
- Cantor pairing function
- Cantor set
- Cantor space
- Cantor tree surface
- Cantor's back-and-forth method
- Cantor's diagonal argument
- Cantor's intersection theorem
- Cantor's isomorphism theorem
- Cantor's first set theory article
- Cantor's leaky tent
- Cantor's paradox
- Cantor's theorem
- Cantor–Bendixson rank
- Cantor–Bendixson theorem
- Cantor–Bernstein theorem
- Cantor–Dedekind axiom
- Heine–Cantor theorem
- Cantor–Schröder–Bernstein theorem
  - Cantor–Schröder–Bernstein property
- Smith–Volterra–Cantor set

== Other ==
- Cantor (asteroid)
- Cantor (crater)
- Cantor medal
- Georg Cantor Gymnasium
