= Joseph Hontheim =

German Catholic theologian (1858–1929)

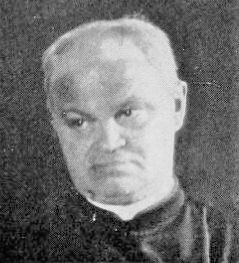
- Portrait of Hontheim
- Born: 18 July 1858; Olewig, Germany
- Died: 2 February 1929 (aged 70); South Holland, Netherlands
- Occupation: Theologian

Joseph Hontheim (18 July 1858 – 2 February 1929) was a Dutch Catholic theologian chiefly remembered for corresponding with Georg Cantor to formulate the mental concept of the infinite, and for the publications Institutiones theodicaeae: sive theologiae naturalis secundum principia S. Thomae Aquinatis (1893) and Hell (1910).

== Biography ==
Joseph Hontheim was born in Olewig, near Trier, Germany, on 18 July 1858.

He was known to be associated with Jesuits of Maria Laach Abbey, from these a series of contributions to the neo-Thomism school seeking to revive the teachings of Saint Thomas Aquinas were published, under the title Philosophiae Lacensis. Also published an 1895 work entitled Der logisch Algorithmus (The Algorithmic Logic), his contribution was among a group working to revive Aeterni Partis.

He died in South Holland on 2 February 1929.

== Works ==
=== Institutiones Theodicaeae ===
In clarifying understanding to the essence (media) of the divine intellect of God and his relation to the Universe and the fate and actions of humanity, that is God's providence, advocating esp. Molinism Hontheim found in Divine omniscience, there to be no true human free will in that all actions are of a prior determined nature by God (in omnipotence) and in that the materia of the universe is in itself the substance also of God.

=== Hell ===
In 1910 a work was published upon the subject of Hell.

The writing begins with an etymology of the English language term and theological understanding, and usage and identification of a number of alternative terms signifying Hades within the Bible {C.E. paragraphs I & II}, continuing to those authorities of old considered to have erred in attribution of meaning to the concept of hell through interpretation of scripture, dispensing with metaphysical notions, to locate the place firmly in the world of the real and physical world. Continuing through a survey of previous ecclesiastical opinion that the place is perhaps subterranean, though considered by the theologian and his peers as an exact location unknown, he includes as part of his survey the need as an imperative of a person to contemplate the manner by which they might be redeemed from having to dwell within there at all {paragraph III}.

The second part is separated into six paragraphs, three of shorter length. The second part begins with a confirmation of the fate of all those persons at the present time and those in Biblical times who failed to appreciate the punishment awaiting themselves in hell, continuing to find proof in the scriptures for the existence hell available not only to Christian adherents, but also to the rational mind. {paragraphs I, II, III & IV} In paragraph V Hontheim provides reasoning that the punishment of sinners is evident from his own observation of the ways of the world and a rationale for the necessitated existence of hell versus the therefore negated possibility of death being the same as the annihilation of the self. The author using inductive reasoning as the merit of the argument evidence Ipso facto from the reality of the state of affairs of the world providing that the existence of hell is evident. Concluding to affirm his own argument based on the likelihood of a retributory existence due to the de facto state of the world, and evidenced from the autonomous majority of peoples {paragraph V}.

Part three is the longest part by a little way and begins by examining attitudes to the eternally damned, from sources in history among people and peoples within the Church {paragraph I}, looking into Biblical sources {paragraph II} and refuting other criticisms that hell is anything other than a condemnation to last for eternity. In the third paragraph the author sees the existence of hell as produced by the needs of a moral functioning of all life including that of God, that is of humanities relation to God and that the divine Creator having produced all the heavens and earth should have ordered the world as fitting for the moral person to understand death as necessary and of divine purpose. In the remainder of the part the author counters objection and critique of the doctrine set forth by the Church, and re-iterates the holding a true understanding of an everlasting retribution and hellish Hell-bound fate for sinners, going so far as to cast doubt on the likelihood even of the existence of Purgatorio for the souls.

In part four Hontheim includes reference to St Thomas for the first time and examines the conditions of those that would dwell within Hell with respect to whether they possess any capacity for moral choice due to their eternal division from the divine medium that had empowered them while dwelling on earth, of this he concludes no choice is possible other than those delimited to hatred.

In part five the Hontheim describes an element of suffering of those souls in Hell and analysis of this and the thoughts of those that dwell within.

Parts six, seven and eight continue with the description of the nature of the suffering of the damned concluding with a rebuffal of the suggestion that the souls of Hell would adapt to their existence there-by through tolerance learn the favour of such a place to re-iterate the earlier preference for a suffering that never ceases.

=== Correspondences ===
He was in correspondence with Cantor during December 1893.

=== Other publications ===
- Theodicea sive theologia naturalis in usum scholarum, (1893).
- Das Buch Job (The Book of Job), (1904).

Hontheim also contributed to the Catholic Encyclopedia.
