= Controversy over Cantor's theory =

About mathematical infinity

In mathematical logic, the theory of infinite sets was first developed by Georg Cantor. Although this work has become a thoroughly standard fixture of classical set theory, it has been criticized in several areas by mathematicians and philosophers.

Cantor's theorem implies that there are sets having cardinality greater than the infinite cardinality of the set of natural numbers. Cantor's argument for this theorem is presented with one small change. This argument can be improved by using a definition he gave later. The resulting argument uses only five axioms of set theory.

Cantor's set theory was controversial at the start, but later became largely accepted. Most modern mathematics textbooks implicitly use Cantor's views on mathematical infinity. For example, a line is generally presented as the infinite set of its points, and it is commonly taught that there are more real numbers than rational numbers (see cardinality of the continuum).

== Cantor's argument ==
Cantor's first proof that infinite sets can have different cardinalities was published in 1874. This proof demonstrates that the set of natural numbers and the set of real numbers have different cardinalities. It uses the theorem that a bounded increasing sequence of real numbers has a limit, which can be proved by using Cantor's or Richard Dedekind's construction of the irrational numbers. Because Leopold Kronecker did not accept these constructions, Cantor was motivated to develop a new proof.

In 1891, he published "a much simpler proof ... which does not depend on considering the irrational numbers." His new proof uses his diagonal argument to prove that there exists an infinite set with a larger number of elements (or greater cardinality) than the set of natural numbers N = {1, 2, 3, ...}. This larger set consists of the elements (x_{1}, x_{2}, x_{3}, ...), where each x_{n} is either m or w. Each of these elements corresponds to a subset of N—namely, the element (x_{1}, x_{2}, x_{3}, ...) corresponds to {n ∈ N: x_{n} = w}. So Cantor's argument implies that the set of all subsets of N has greater cardinality than N. The set of all subsets of N is denoted by P(N), the power set of N.

Cantor generalized his argument to an arbitrary set A and the set consisting of all functions from A to {0, 1}. Each of these functions corresponds to a subset of A, so his generalized argument implies the theorem: The power set P(A) has greater cardinality than A. This is known as Cantor's theorem.

The argument below is a modern version of Cantor's argument that uses power sets (for his original argument, see Cantor's diagonal argument). By presenting a modern argument, it is possible to see which assumptions of axiomatic set theory are used. The first part of the argument proves that N and P(N) have different cardinalities:

- There exists at least one infinite set. This assumption (not formally specified by Cantor) is captured in formal set theory by the axiom of infinity. This axiom implies that N, the set of all natural numbers, exists.
- P(N), the set of all subsets of N, exists. In formal set theory, this is implied by the power set axiom, which says that for every set there is a set of all of its subsets.
- The concept of "having the same number" or "having the same cardinality" can be captured by the idea of one-to-one correspondence. This (purely definitional) assumption is sometimes known as Hume's principle. As Frege said, "If a waiter wishes to be certain of laying exactly as many knives on a table as plates, he has no need to count either of them; all he has to do is to lay immediately to the right of every plate a knife, taking care that every knife on the table lies immediately to the right of a plate. Plates and knives are thus correlated one to one." Sets in such a correlation are called equinumerous, and the correlation is called a one-to-one correspondence.
- A set cannot be put into one-to-one correspondence with its power set. This implies that N and P(N) have different cardinalities. It depends on very few assumptions of set theory, and, as John P. Mayberry puts it, is a "simple and beautiful argument" that is "pregnant with consequences". Here is the argument:
  Let $A$ be a set and $P(A)$ be its power set. The following theorem will be proved: If $f$ is a function from $A$ to $P(A),$ then it is not onto. This theorem implies that there is no one-to-one correspondence between $A$ and $P(A)$ since such a correspondence must be onto. Proof of theorem: Define the diagonal subset $D = \{x \in A : x \notin f(x)\}.$ Since $D \in P(A),$ proving that for all $x \in A,\, D \ne f(x)$ will imply that $f$ is not onto. Let $x \in A.$ Then $x \in D \Leftrightarrow x \notin f(x),$ which implies $x \notin D \Leftrightarrow x \in f(x).$ So if $x \in D,$ then $x \notin f(x);$ and if $x \notin D,$ then $x \in f(x).$ Since one of these sets contains $x$ and the other does not, $D \ne f(x).$ Therefore, $D$ is not in the image of $f$, so $f$ is not onto.

Next Cantor shows that $A$ is equinumerous with a subset of $P(A)$. From this and the fact that $P(A)$ and $A$ have different cardinalities, he concludes that $P(A)$ has greater cardinality than $A$. This conclusion uses his 1878 definition: If A and B have different cardinalities, then either B is equinumerous with a subset of A (in this case, B has less cardinality than A) or A is equinumerous with a subset of B (in this case, B has greater cardinality than A). This definition leaves out the case where A and B are equinumerous with a subset of the other set—that is, A is equinumerous with a subset of B and B is equinumerous with a subset of A. Because Cantor implicitly assumed that cardinalities are linearly ordered, this case cannot occur. After using his 1878 definition, Cantor stated that in an 1883 article he proved that cardinalities are well-ordered, which implies they are linearly ordered. This proof used his well-ordering principle "every set can be well-ordered", which he called a "law of thought". The well-ordering principle is equivalent to the axiom of choice.

Around 1895, Cantor began to regard the well-ordering principle as a theorem and attempted to prove it. In 1895, Cantor also gave a new definition of "greater than" that correctly defines this concept without the aid of his well-ordering principle. By using Cantor's new definition, the modern argument that P(N) has greater cardinality than N can be completed using weaker assumptions than his original argument:

- The concept of "having greater cardinality" can be captured by Cantor's 1895 definition: B has greater cardinality than A if (1) A is equinumerous with a subset of B, and (2) B is not equinumerous with a subset of A. Clause (1) says B is at least as large as A, which is consistent with our definition of "having the same cardinality". Clause (2) implies that the case where A and B are equinumerous with a subset of the other set is false. Since clause (2) says that A is not at least as large as B, the two clauses together say that B is larger (has greater cardinality) than A.
- The power set $P(A)$ has greater cardinality than $A,$ which implies that P(N) has greater cardinality than N. Here is the proof:
  1. Define the subset $P_1 = \{\,y \in P(A): \exists x \in A\,(y = \{x\})\,\}.$ Define $f(x) = \{x\},$ which maps $A$ onto $P_1.$ Since $f(x_1) = f(x_2)$ implies $x_1 = x_2, \, f$ is a one-to-one correspondence from $A$ to $P_1.$ Therefore, $A$ is equinumerous with a subset of $P(A).$
  2. Using proof by contradiction, assume that $A_1,$ a subset of $A,$ is equinumerous with $P(A).$. Then there is a one-to-one correspondence $g$ from $A_1$ to $P(A).$ Define $h$ from $A$ to $P(A)\text{:}$ if $x \in A_1,$ then $h(x) = g(x);$ if $x \in A \setminus A_1,$ then $h(x) = \{ \, \}.$ Since $g$ maps $A_1$ onto $P(A), \, h$ maps $A$ onto $P(A),$ contradicting the theorem above stating that a function from $A$ to $P(A)$ is not onto. Therefore, $P(A)$ is not equinumerous with a subset of $A.$

Besides the axioms of infinity and power set, the axioms of separation, extensionality, and pairing were used in the modern argument. For example, the axiom of separation was used to define the diagonal subset $D,$ the axiom of extensionality was used to prove $D \ne f(x),$ and the axiom of pairing was used in the definition of the subset $P_1.$

== Reception of the argument ==
Initially, Cantor's theory was controversial among mathematicians and (later) philosophers. Logician Wilfrid Hodges (1998) has commented on the energy devoted to refuting this "harmless little argument" (i.e. Cantor's diagonal argument) asking, "what had it done to anyone to make them angry with it?" Mathematician Solomon Feferman has referred to Cantor's theories as "simply not relevant to everyday mathematics."

Before Cantor, the notion of infinity was often taken as a useful abstraction which helped mathematicians reason about the finite world; for example the use of infinite limit cases in calculus. The infinite was deemed to have at most a potential existence, rather than an actual existence. "Actual infinity does not exist. What we call infinite is only the endless possibility of creating new objects no matter how many exist already". Carl Friedrich Gauss's views on the subject can be paraphrased as: "Infinity is nothing more than a figure of speech which helps us talk about limits. The notion of a completed infinity doesn't belong in mathematics." In other words, the only access we have to the infinite is through the notion of limits, and hence, we must not treat infinite sets as if they have an existence exactly comparable to the existence of finite sets.

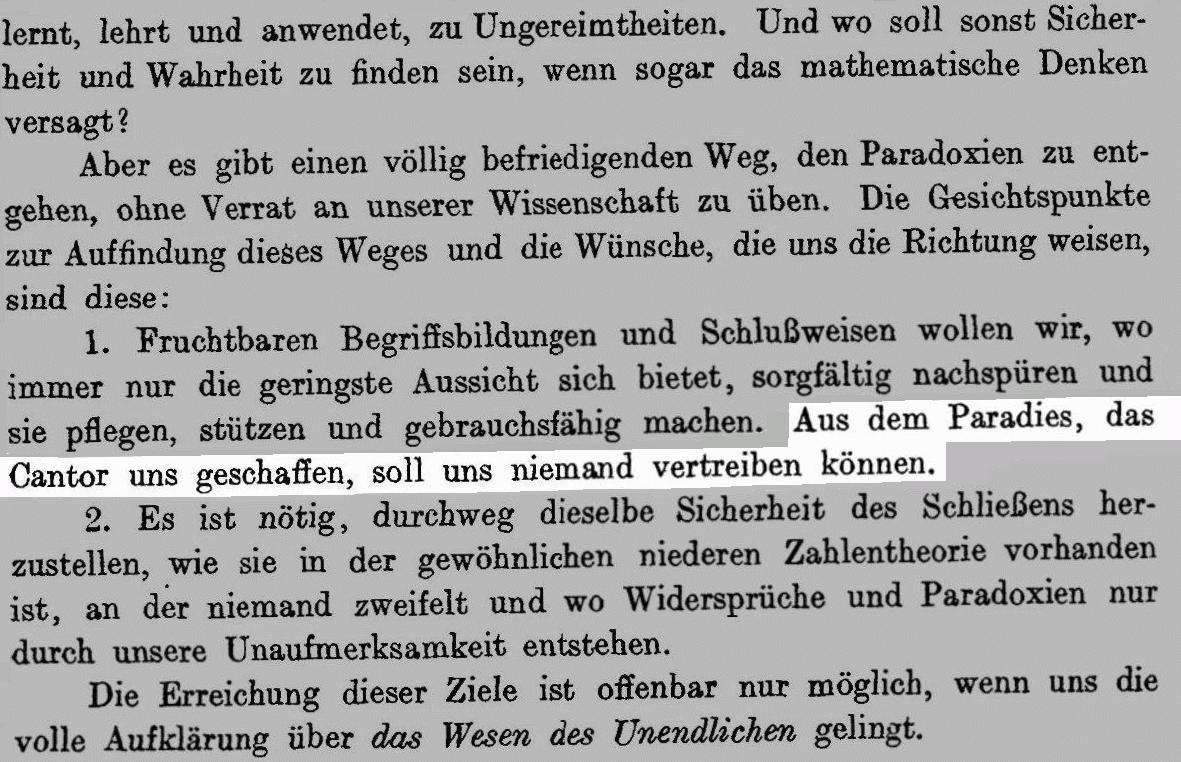
"From the paradise that Cantor created for us no-one shall be able to expel us." Hilbert (1926, p. 170), in a lecture given in Münster to Mathematical Society of Westphalia on 4 June 1925

Cantor's ideas ultimately were largely accepted, strongly supported by David Hilbert, amongst others. Hilbert predicted: "No one will drive us from the paradise which Cantor created for us." To which Wittgenstein replied "if one person can see it as a paradise of mathematicians, why should not another see it as a joke?" The rejection of Cantor's infinitary ideas influenced the development of schools of mathematics such as constructivism and intuitionism.

Wittgenstein did not object to mathematical formalism wholesale, but had a finitist view on what Cantor's proof meant. The philosopher maintained that belief in infinities arises from confusing the intensional nature of mathematical laws with the extensional nature of sets, sequences, symbols etc. A series of symbols is finite in his view: In Wittgenstein's words: "...A curve is not composed of points, it is a law that points obey, or again, a law according to which points can be constructed."

He also described the diagonal argument as "hocus pocus" and not proving what it purports to do.

Presentations and discussions of Hilbert's "paradise" saying include: Ferreirós, Shelah, Peckhaus, Medium.

== Objection to the axiom of infinity ==
A common objection to Cantor's theory of infinite number involves the axiom of infinity (which is, indeed, an axiom and not a logical truth). Mayberry has noted that "the set-theoretical axioms that sustain modern mathematics are self-evident in differing degrees. One of them—indeed, the most important of them, namely Cantor's Axiom, the so-called Axiom of Infinity—has scarcely any claim to self-evidence at all".

Another objection is that the use of infinite sets is not adequately justified by analogy to finite sets. Hermann Weyl wrote:

... classical logic was abstracted from the mathematics of finite sets and their subsets …. Forgetful of this limited origin, one afterwards mistook that logic for something above and prior to all mathematics, and finally applied it, without justification, to the mathematics of infinite sets. This is the Fall and original sin of [Cantor's] set theory

The difficulty with finitism is to develop foundations of mathematics using finitist assumptions that incorporate what everyone reasonably regards as mathematics (for example, real analysis).

== See also ==
- Preintuitionism
