= Point-surjective morphism =

Concept in category theory

In category theory, a point-surjective morphism is a morphism $f : X \rightarrow Y$ that "behaves" like surjections on the category of sets.

The notion of point-surjectivity is an important one in Lawvere's fixed-point theorem, and it first was introduced by William Lawvere in his original article.

== Definition ==
=== Point-surjectivity ===
In a category $\mathbf{C}$ with a terminal object $1$, a morphism $f : X \rightarrow Y$ is said to be point-surjective if for every morphism $y : 1 \rightarrow Y$, there exists a morphism $x : 1 \rightarrow X$ such that $f \circ x = y$.

=== Weak point-surjectivity ===
Weak point-surjectivity

If $Y$ is an exponential object of the form $B^A$ for some objects $A, B$ in $\mathbf{C}$, a weaker (but technically more cumbersome) notion of point-surjectivity can be defined.

A morphism $f : X \rightarrow B^A$ is said to be weakly point-surjective if for every morphism $g : A \rightarrow B$ there exists a morphism $x : 1 \rightarrow X$ such that, for every morphism $a : 1 \rightarrow A$, we have

$$\epsilon \circ \langle f \circ x, a \rangle = g \circ a$$

where $\langle -, - \rangle : A \rightarrow B \times C$ denotes the product of two morphisms ($A \rightarrow B$ and $A \rightarrow C$) and $\epsilon : B^A \times A \rightarrow B$ is the evaluation map in the category of morphisms of $\mathbf{C}$.

Equivalently, one could think of the morphism $f: X \rightarrow B^A$ as the transpose of some other morphism $\tilde{f}: X \times A \rightarrow B$. Then the isomorphism between the hom-sets $\mathrm{Hom}(X\times A,B) \cong \mathrm{Hom}(X,B^A)$ allow us to say that $f$ is weakly point-surjective if and only if $\tilde{f}$ is weakly point-surjective.

== Relation to surjective functions in Set ==
=== Set elements as morphisms from terminal objects ===
In the category of sets, morphisms are functions and the terminal objects are singletons. Therefore, a morphism $a : 1 \rightarrow A$ is a function from a singleton $\{x\}$ to the set $A$: since a function must specify a unique element in the codomain for every element in the domain, we have that $a(x) \in A$ is one specific element of $A$. Therefore, each morphism $a : 1 \rightarrow A$ can be thought of as a specific element of $A$ itself.

For this reason, morphisms $a : 1 \rightarrow A$ can serve as a "generalization" of elements of a set, and are sometimes called global elements.

=== Surjective functions and point-surjectivity ===
With that correspondence, the definition of point-surjective morphisms closely resembles that of surjective functions. A function (morphism) $f : X \rightarrow Y$ is said to be surjective (point-surjective) if, for every element $y \in Y$ (for every morphism $y : 1 \rightarrow Y$), there exists an element $x \in X$ (there exists a morphism $x: 1 \rightarrow X$) such that $f(x) = y$ ( $f \circ x = y$).

The notion of weak point-surjectivity also resembles this correspondence, if only one notices that the exponential object $B^A$ in the category of sets is nothing but the set of all functions $f : A \rightarrow B$.
