= Tilman Pesch =

German Jesuit philosopher (1836–1899)

Tilman Pesch (1 February 1836, at Cologne – 18 October 1899, at Valkenburg, Limburg, the Netherlands), was a German philosopher.

== Life ==
He became a Jesuit on 15 October 1852, and made his novitiate at Friedrichsburg near Münster; he studied classics two years at Paderborn, philosophy two years at Bonn; taught four years at Feldkirch, Austria; studied theology one year at Paderborn and three years at Maria-Laach, after which he made his third year of novitiate at Paderborn. He then taught philosophy at Maria-Laach (1867–69). From 1870 to 1876 he worked in the ministry, and again taught philosophy eight years (1876–84), at the Castle of Bleijenbeek in Afferden.

Pesch was tireless as a missionary in Germany. He was often arrested under the charge of being a Jesuit. Pesch taught the best in scholasticism, but appreciated what was good in other systems of philosophy. His Latin writing contain the latest results of natural science applied to the illustration of truth by scholastic methods.

== Works ==
The literary activity of Pesch began in 1876. He contributed to Philosophia Licensis; Institutiones philosophiæ naturalis (1880); Institutiones logicales (1888); Institutiones psychologicæ (1896–98).

The last fifteen years of his life were devoted entirely to writing and to the ministry. Treatises were: Weltphänomenon (1881); Welträtsel (1884), Seele und Leib (1893), and Christliche Lebensphilosophie (1895). The last work reached its fourth edition with three years.

Besides scholarly writing, he published popular philosophical and Apologetic articles and pamphlets. The most important of these were the articles published in the "Germanica" above the pseudonym "Gottlieb"; they were later arranged in three volumes, Briefe aus Hamburg (1883), Der Krach von Wittenburg (1889), and Wittenberg und Rom (1889), arguing against common criticisms of the Catholic Church.

His most popular book was Das Religiöse Leben, of which thirteen large editions appeared.
