= Naturally occurring retirement community =

Demographic term

A naturally occurring retirement community (NORC; /nɔːrk/) is a community that has a large proportion of residents over 60 but was not specifically planned or designed to meet the needs of seniors living independently in their homes.

NORCs may develop in three ways:

- Aging in place: numerous persons moved into a community when they were younger
- Emigration: older people remain in a community as younger residents move out
- Immigration: numerous older people move into a community

== History ==
The demographic term "NORC" was first coined in the 1980s by Michael Hunt, a professor of urban planning at the University of Wisconsin–Madison. He defined NORCs as neighborhoods and housing developments, originally built for young families, in which 50 percent of the residents are 50 years or older and have aged in place. Over time, this threshold definition has been adjusted by communities and policymakers to reflect local residential patterns.

For example, in the US, the federal government, through Title IV of the Older Americans Act, recognizes NORCs as communities in which at least 40 percent of the heads of households are older individuals. The State of Indiana defines a NORC as a community in which 50 percent of housing units have heads of household who are 60 years old or older, and/or at least 2,500 heads of household who are 60 years old or older. By contrast, New York City requires that a community must have at least 45 percent of housing units with heads of household 60 years old or older with a minimum count of at least 250 seniors, or that there be at least 500 older adults who are 60 years old or older (regardless of the percentage of housing units).

== Types ==
NORCs are geographically defined either by the dimensions of an apartment building complex or by the boundaries of a neighborhood. While NORCs were first identified in urban settings, they can actually be found in communities large and small, and in all geographic settings. A NORC can generally be categorized as one of three types:

- Classic NORC. Also called a "housing-based," "vertical," or "closed" NORC, a classic NORC may be a single age-integrated apartment building, a housing complex with multiple buildings under common management, or an area where a number of apartment buildings are clustered together.
- Neighborhood-based NORC. Also known as a "horizontal" or "open" NORC, a neighborhood-based NORC is typically an age-integrated neighborhood of one- and two-family homes.
- Rural NORC. Also known as a Naturally Occurring Retirement Region (NORR), a rural NORC covers a large geographic area in which the population density is low, typically comprising one- and two family homes.

== Programs ==
In response to the NORC demographic phenomenon, many communities have developed NORC programs, also known as NORC supportive service programs (NORC-SSPs or just SSPs), to serve their senior residents by providing social and health care services tailored to their specific needs. The community-based programs are often partnerships of housing/neighborhood organizations, residents, health and social service providers, and other community stakeholders. While each NORC program may provide a unique scope of services, all NORC programs share one goal—maximizing the health and well-being of resident seniors so they can maintain their independence and comfortably remain in their homes as they age in place.

NORC programs are generally supported by some mix of public and private funding, combining revenue and in-kind supports from government agencies, housing partners, philanthropies, corporations, community stakeholders, and residents. NORC program services may include case management, health care management, recreational and educational activities, transportation, and volunteer opportunities for senior residents. A hallmark of the NORC program model is its flexibility in identifying and providing the kinds of services needed by the community and the seniors who live there.

The first NORC program was established in 1986 at Penn South Houses, a ten-building 2,800-unit moderate-income housing cooperative located in New York City, with support from the UJA/Federation of New York. Since then, the NORC program model has been broadly replicated at the local, state, and national levels and can be found in more than 25 states across the country.

== Sources ==
- Anetzberger, G. J. (2010). "Community options of greater Cleveland, Ohio: Preliminary evaluation of a naturally occurring retirement community program." Clinical Gerontologist, 33(1), 1–15.
- Bedney, B. J., Goldberg, R. B., & Josephson, K. (2010). "Aging in place in naturally occurring retirement communities: Transforming aging through supportive service programs." Journal of Housing for the Elderly, 24(3–4), 304–321.
- Bennett, P. (2010). "Exploration and assessment of the NORC transformation process." Journal of Housing for the Elderly, 24(3–4), 373–391.
- Bronstein, L., Gellis, Z. D., & Kenaley, B. L. (2011). "A neighborhood naturally occurring retirement community: Views from providers and residents." The Journal of Applied Gerontology, 30(1), 104–112.
- Bronstein, L., & Kenaley, B. (2010). "Learning from vertical NORCs: Challenges and recommendations for horizontal NORCs." Journal of Housing for the Elderly, 24(3–4), 237–248.
- Cohen-Mansfield, J., Dakheel-Ali, M., & Jensen, B. (2013). "Predicting service use and intent to use services of older adult residents of two naturally occurring retirement communities." Social Work Research, 37(4), 313–326.
- Elbert, K., & Neufeld, P. (2010). "Indicators of a successful naturally occurring retirement community: A case study." Journal of Housing for the Elderly, 24(3), 322–334.
- Enguidanos, S., Pynoos, J., Denton, A., Alexman, S., & Diepenbrock, L. (2010). "Comparison of barriers and facilitators in developing NORC programs: A tale of two communities." Journal of Housing for the Elderly, 24(3–4), 291–303.
- Grant-Savela, S. (2010). "Active living among older residents of a rural naturally occurring retirement community." The Journal of Applied Gerontology, 29(5), 531–553.
- Greenfield, E. A. (2014). "Community aging initiatives and social capital: Developing theories of change in the context of NORC supportive service programs." Journal of Applied Gerontology, 33(2), 227–250.
- Ivery, J., Akstein-Kahan, D., & Murphy, K. (2010). "Norc supportive services model implementation and community capacity." Journal of Gerontological Social Work, 53(1), 21–42.
- Ivery, Jan M., and Deborah Akstein-Kahan. "The Naturally Occurring Retirement Community (NORC) Initiative in Georgia: Developing and Managing Collaborative Partnerships to Support Older Adults." Administration in Social Work 34.4 (2010): 329–343.
- Kloseck, Marita, Richard G. Crilly, and Gloria M. Gutman. "Naturally Occurring Retirement Communities: Untapped Resources to Enable Optimal Aging at Home." Journal of Housing for the Elderly 24.3–4 (2010): 392–412.
- Lun, M. (2010). "The correlate of religion involvement and formal service use among community-dwelling elders: An explorative case of naturally occurring retirement community." Journal of Religion & Spirituality in Social Work, 29(3), 207–217.
- MacLaren, C., Dsw, G. L., & Schwartz, H. (2007). "History, accomplishments, issues and prospects of supportive service programs in naturally occurring retirement communities in New York State: Lessons learned." Journal of Gerontological Social Work, 49(1–2), 127–144.
- Masotti, P. J., Fick, R., & O'Connor, K. (2010). "Healthy naturally occurring retirement communities: The need for increased collaboration between local public health agencies and municipal government." Journal of Housing for the Elderly, 24(3–4), 249–266.
- Pine, V., & Pine, P. (2002). "Naturally occurring retirement community-supportive service program: An example of devolution." Journal of Aging & Social Policy, 14(3), 181–193.
- Tremoulet, A. (2010). "Manufactured home parks: NORCs awaiting discovery." Journal of Housing for the Elderly, 24(3–4), 335–355.
- Vladeck, F., Segel, R., Oberlink, M., Gursen, M. D., & Rudin, D. (2010). "Health indicators: A proactive and systematic approach to healthy aging." Cityscape, 12(2), 67–84.
- Vladeck, F. (2012). "The Next Generation of Senior Services: Responding to Health Reform." Care Management Journals, 13(1), 37–41.
