= Abraham Fraenkel =

German-Israeli mathematician and Zionist (1891–1965)

- אברהם פרנקל
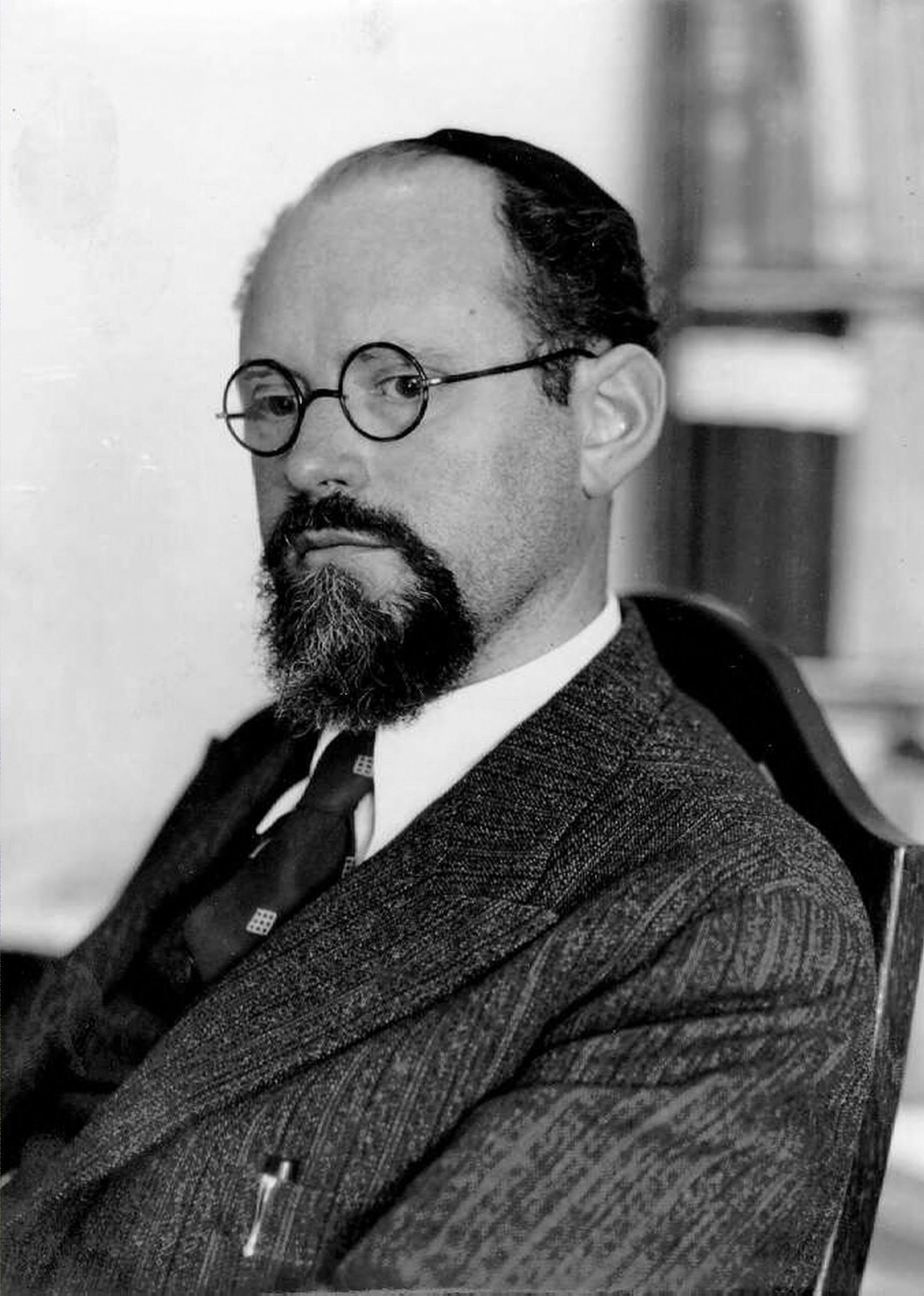
- Fraenkel in the 1940s
- Born: 17 February 1891; Munich, Bavaria
- Died: 15 October 1965 (aged 74); Jerusalem, Israel
- Education: Marburg University
- Known for: Zermelo–Fraenkel axioms
- Awards: Israel Prize (1956)
- Scientific career
- Fields: Mathematics
- Workplaces: Hebrew University of Jerusalem
- Doctoral advisor: Kurt Hensel

Abraham Fraenkel (Hebrew: אברהם הלוי (אדולף) פרנקל; 17 February 1891 – 15 October 1965) was a German-born Israeli mathematician. He was an early Zionist and the first Dean of Mathematics at the Hebrew University of Jerusalem. He is known for his contributions to axiomatic set theory, especially his additions to Ernst Zermelo's axioms, which resulted in the Zermelo–Fraenkel set theory.

== Biography ==
Abraham Adolf Halevi Fraenkel studied mathematics at the Ludwig-Maximilians-Universität München, the Friedrich Wilhelm University of Berlin, Marburg University, and he University of Breslau. After graduating, he lectured at the University of Marburg from 1916, and was promoted to professor in 1922.

In 1919, he married Wilhelmina Malka A. Prins (1892–1983). Due to the severe housing shortage in post-First World war Germany, for a few years the couple lived with fellow professor Kurt Hensel as subtenants.

After leaving Marburg University in 1928, Fraenkel taught at Kiel University for a year. He then made the choice of accepting a position at the Hebrew University of Jerusalem, which had been founded four years earlier, where he spent the rest of his career. He became the first dean of the faculty of mathematics, and for a while served as rector of the university.

On his final move to Palestine in 1933 (after losing his job in Germany due to the "Law for the Restoration of the Professional Civil Service"), Fraenkel changed his name from Adolf (Hitler's first name) to Abraham. He was a fervent Zionist and as such was a member of Jewish National Council and the Jewish Assembly of Representatives under the British mandate. He also belonged to the Mizrachi religious wing of Zionism, which promoted Jewish religious education and schools, and which advocated giving the Chief Rabbinate authority over marriage and divorce.

== Mathematician ==
Fraenkel's early work was on Kurt Hensel's p-adic numbers and on the theory of rings. He is best known for his work on axiomatic set theory, publishing his first major work on the topic Einleitung in die Mengenlehre (Introduction to set theory) in 1919. In 1922 and 1925, he published two papers that sought to improve Zermelo's axiomatic system; the result is the Zermelo–Fraenkel axioms. Fraenkel worked in set theory and foundational mathematics.

Fraenkel was also interested in the history of mathematics, writing in 1920 and 1930 about Gauss's works in algebra, and he published a biography of Georg Cantor. After retiring from the Hebrew University and being succeeded by his former student Abraham Robinson, Fraenkel continued teaching at the Bar Ilan University in Ramat Gan (near Tel Aviv).

== Awards ==
- In 1956, Fraenkel was awarded the Israel Prize, for exact sciences.

== Published works ==
- 1908. "Bestimmung des Datums des jüdischen Osterfestes für die Zeitrechnung der Mohammedaner". In Zeitschrift für Mathematik und naturwissenschaft Unterricht (39).
- 1909. "Eine Formel zur Verwandlung jüdischer Daten in mohammedanische". In Monatsschrift für Geschichte und Wissenschaft des Judentums, vol. 53, issue 11–12.
- 1910. "Die Berechnung des Osterfestes". Journal für die reine und angewandte Mathematik, vol 138.
- "Über die Teiler der Null und die Zerlegung von Ringen". J. Reine Angew. Math. 145: 139–176. 1914. doi:10.1515/crll.1915.145.139.
- 1918. "Praktisches zur Universitätsgründung in Jerusalem". Der Jude 3:404–414.
- 1918b. "Mathematik und Apologie". Jeschurun, 5:112–126.
- 1919. Einleitung in die Mengenlehre. Berlin: Julius Springer.
- 1920. Materialien für eine wissenschaftliche Biographie von Gauss.
- 1921. "Die neueren Ideen zur Grundlagung der Analysis und Mengenlehre". In Jahresbericht der Deutschen Mathematiker-Vereinigung.
- 1922. "Axiomatische Begründung der transfiniten Kardinalzahlen I — Herrn K. Hensel zum sechzigsten Geburtstag". Mathematische Zeitschrift. 13: 153–188. 1922. doi:10.1007/bf01485286. S2CID 119960359.
- 1922b. "The notion of 'definite' and the independence of the axiom of choice". In Jean van Heijenoort, 1967. From Frege to Gödel: A Source Book in Mathematical Logic, 1879–1931. Harvard University Press: 284–289.
- 1922c. "Zu den Grundlage der Cantor-Zermeloschen Mengenlehre". Math. Annalen. 86 (3–4): 230–237. 1922. doi:10.1007/bf01457986. S2CID 122212740.
- 1924. "Die neueren Ideen zur Grundlegung der Analysis und Mengenlehre". In Jahrsebericht Der Deutschen Mathematiker-Vereinigung, Vol 33, 97–103.
- 1924. "The Jewish University in Jerusalem (From the Viewpoint of Orthodoxy)". Jewish Forum, January: VII (1), 27–31.
- 1924b "The Jewish University in Jerusalem (From the Viewpoint of Orthodoxy)". Jewish Forum, May: VII (5), 299–302.
- 1925. "Leben, Natur, Religion". Jeschurun 12:337–348.
- 1927. Zehn Vorlesungen über die Grundlegung der Mengenlehre. B. G. Teubner.
- 1930. "Georg Cantor". In Jahresbericht der Deutschen Mathematiker-Vereinigung 39, 189–266. Also appeared separately as Georg Cantor Leipzig: B. G. Teubner and is abridged in Cantor's Gesammelte Abhandlungen.
- 1930–1931 (5691). "אמונות ודעות לאור מדעי הטבע". Part 1 in ההד VI(8) 16–19, part 2 in ההד VI(9). Reprinted together as a monograph by ההד in 1931 Reprinted in 1987–8. Translated by Mark Zelcer in Hakirah vol. 12.
- 1930–1931b. "Die heutigen Gegensätze in der Grundlegung der Mathematik." In Erkenntnis vol. 1.
- 1935. "Zum Diagonalverfahren Cantors". Fundamenta Mathematicae 25, 45–50.
- 1935. "Concerning the Method of Number Pairs". Philosophy of Science 2 (1).
- 1938. "Alfred Loewy (1873–1935)". In Scripta Mathematica vol. V(1).
- 1939. "Natural Numbers as Cardinals". In Scripta Mathematica VI (2).
- 1940. "Natural Numbers as Ordinals". In Scripta Mathematica VII (1–4).
- 1941. "מכתב למערכת". In הצופה 12 September, p8.
- 1943. הילודה בישוב ובעיותיה. Jerusalem: D. B. Aaronson.
- 1943b. יצחק ניוטון 1642–1942: דברים שנאמרו על-ידי ד"ר י.ל. מאגנס, ... , א.ה. פרנקל ... י.רקח ... בחגיגת ניוטון שנערכה באוניברסיטה העברית בירושלים, ביום ג' אדר תש"ג [1943]. ירושלים : חברה להוצאת ספרים על-יד האוניברסיטה העברית
- 1943c. "Problems and Methods in Modern Mathematics – 1". In Scripta Mathematica IX (1).
- 1943d. "Problems and Methods in Modern Mathematics – 2". In Scripta Mathematica IX (2).
- 1943e. "Problems and Methods in Modern Mathematics – 3". In Scripta Mathematica IX (3).
- 1943c. "Problems and Methods in Modern Mathematics – 4". In Scripta Mathematica IX (4).
- 1944. "Problems and Methods in Modern Mathematics – 5". In Scripta Mathematica X (3–4).
- 1945. "על נימוקיהם של דחיית אד"ו ושל הסדר גו"ח אדז"ט לשנים המעוברות". In Y. L. Fishman (ed.) זכרון לנשמת הרב אברהם יצחק הכהן קוק למלאות עשר שנים לפטירתו, קובץ תורני-מדעי. Jerusalem Mossad HaRav Kook.
- 1946. "Address by Abraham A. Fraenkel". In Founder's Day: The Dropsie College for Hebrew and Cognate learning. Addresses: The Honorable Herbert H. Lehman, Professor Abraham Fraenkel. Philadelphia: Dropsie College.
- 1946. "The Recent Controversies about the Foundations of Mathematics". In Scripta Mathematica XII(4).
- 1947. "The Hebrew University and the Regulation of Secondary Education in Palestine". In Jewish Education 18:2.
- 1947. "The recent controversies about the foundation of mathematics". In Scripta Mathematica XIII, pp 17–36.
- 1951. "On the Crisis of the Principle of Excluded Middle". In Scripta Mathematica XV (1–2).
- 1953. מבוא למתמטיקה: בעיות ושיטות מן המתמטיקה החדישה. Ramat Gan: Masada Publishing.
- 1953b. Abstract Set theory. Amsterdam: North Holland Publishing Co.
- 1955. Integers and the Theory of Numbers. New York: [Scripta Mathematica], Yeshiva University.
- 1955b. ."על סדר התפילות בקיבוץ הדתי" In שי לישעיה: ספר יובל לר' ישעיהו וולפסברג בן הששים. Y. Tirosh (ed.). Tel Aviv: Merkaz LeTarbut Shel HaPoel Mizrahi; 193–194.
- 1958. "משום ירקיא – משום מתיא". In Shimon Braunstein and Gershon Chorgon (eds.) ספר יובל לכבוד שמואל קלמן מירסקי. New York: Vaad HaYovel; 248–250.
- 1960. "Jewish mathematics and astronomy". In Scripta Mathematica XXV, pp 33–47. (Appeared in Hebrew in Tekhnika Umada, Tel Aviv, 1947. Footnote 12 of the Scripta Mathematica version claims that the essay was written in the 1930s.)
- 1960. "Epistemology and logic". In Synthese 12, pp. 333–337.
- 1960. "Theory of Sets". In Encyclopædia Britannica.
- 1961. Essays on the foundations of mathematics, dedicated to A. A. Fraenkel on his seventieth anniversary. Y. Bar-Hillel, E. I. J. Poznanski, M. O. Rabin and A. Robinson, eds. Jerusalem, the Hebrew University: Magnes Press.
- 1966 (1953). Abstract Set Theory. North Holland.
- 1966. Set Theory and Logic. Addison-Wesley.
- 1966. "עיבור שנים וקידוש החודש". In אמונה, דת ומדע. Jerusalem: Misrad HaChinuch VeHaTarbut.
- 1967. Lebenskreise: Aus den Erinnerungen eines jüdischen Mathematikers. Deutsche Verlags-Anstalt.
- 1969. "הלוח העברי". Encyclopedia Hebraica, vol 26.
- 1973 (1958). (with Yehoshua Bar-Hillel, Azriel Levy, and Dirk van Dalen) Foundations of Set Theory. North Holland.
- 2016 Recollections of a Jewish Mathematician in Germany. Translated from the German 1967 edition by Allison Brown. Edited by Jiska Cohen-Mansfield. Basel: Springer Birkhäuser History of Science.

== See also ==
- List of Israel Prize recipients
- Fränkel
