= History of Ramapo College =

Ramapo College of New Jersey is a public undergraduate liberal arts college founded in 1969.

== Early years ==
=== Planning and founding ===
Just prior to 1969, the New Jersey system of public higher education consisted of the state university, Rutgers, along with six teachers colleges. The rest of the state's college students sought their educations at a handful of medium-sized private institutions, Princeton University, or an out-of-state college or university. New Jersey had the highest rate of students leaving the state for their college education.

The New Jersey Department of Education produced a report in 1962 recommending a massive expansion and retooling of the public higher education system. Opposition to "broad based" taxes such as a sales or income tax generally hindered greater efforts by the state to spend further sums on higher education. Richard J. Hughes ran for New Jersey governor in 1962 on a platform including among its proposal one to institute a broad-based tax and another to increase the capacity of public higher education. While in office, Hughes succeeded in implementing a sales tax and in passing the Higher Education Act, which, in conjunction with a bond issue approved by the voters, established a Department of Higher Education, a Board of Higher Education, and two new state colleges. State officials rewarded Bergen County legislators for their support of the Higher Education Act with a new college among their constituents.

The board of trustees for the new state college in northern New Jersey assembled for the first time in February 1969. The Department of Higher Education gave the Board much latitude in carrying out its responsibilities—namely, hiring a President, selecting a site, and choosing a basic model for their school. The Department did make clear, however, that they favored an innovative, experimental college. In June, the Board selected George Potter, a somewhat controversial administrator at the experimental Grand Valley State University in Michigan with a master's degree from Oxford University. The search for space on which to establish the new campus met a number of challenges, including cost and negative reception in the communities it explored. Eventually the college arranged to purchase the estate of the former Stephen Birch in Mahwah, New Jersey. The board of trustees set the opening for the fall of 1971.

The architects produced plans for an L-shaped, glass-walled facility, with connected spaces devoted to particular departments or divisions. The architects also recommended a building systems approach in construction to allow for rapid construction of the wings before the opening of the college. Potter would later regret this choice of construction in for its drawbacks in comfort and aesthetics.

Potter took on a number of assistants to help through the planning stages of the college. One of them, Thomas Goss, a colleague of Potter's from Grand Valley State, would exert an outsize influence on the guiding principles and organization of the college. From the beginning, the college made interdisciplinary education a priority and planned to accomplish much of its teaching through seminars, independent study, and experiential learning. Potter and Goss, in effect, charted a middle course between those on the board of trustees who favored a largely traditional institution and those on the other hand who favored a far more radical approach.

=== Admissions and opening ===
Of 3018 formal applications (2701 freshmen and 717 transfer students), Ramapo College accepted 1855 (1302 freshmen, or 57%, and 553 transfer students, or 77%). Of those admitted, 1186 left deposits with the school. Potter had planned for an enrollment of 800 students in the College's first year.

Standards for admission set by the school were considerably relaxed during the course of recruitment. More than half of the students came from Bergen county, and of those, roughly two-thirds came from the more affluent northern expanse.

Classes began September 22, 1971. At the time of the College's opening, five schools had established themselves.

- the School of Contemporary Arts combined communication arts and fine arts
- the School of Theoretical and Applied Science taught pure and applied sciences in a relatively disciplinary manner
- the School of International Studies (later School of Intercultural Studies) focused on international cultures and history,
- the School of American Studies emphasized literature and American history
- the School of Human Environment encompassed a variety of disciplinary and interdisciplinary programs predominantly in the social sciences

Business and other professional programs did not yet exist as majors. The Institute of Management Science, the College name for the business program housed in the Division of Professional Institutes, had a few faculty teaching a few basic business courses and arranging for student field placements.

Among the more distinctive features of Ramapo's undergraduate education, in addition to the persistent interdisciplinary organization, were the tutorial and the core of "Scopes and Methods" courses. The "tutorial" was in fact a series of courses, usually two credits, where faculty were to advise and direct the study of their students. The courses were taught in a small format and often covered some academic content. The tutorials, as established by the college, were fairly unstructured, and not all faculty and students were willing or able to create the bond between students and faculty the tutorial intended. The tutorial resulted in diverse and ultimately uneven experiences for students and faculty alike. Scopes and Methods courses were, on the other hand, an introduction to the history of a discipline and its methodology. Many faculty members, though, felt uncomfortable and unprepared with the emphasis teaching their own work and methodology to their students.

== Restructuring ==
=== Academic reorganization and general education revision ===
In the years following the College's founding, the student environment began to shift. Student demands for career-oriented programs increased, demands were made for a business school, state funding was cut, and demographic changes resulted in decreasing levels of college-aged students entering institutions of higher education.

Financial difficulties, the formation of a business school, and dropping enrollment, the faculty and the Dean of Schools, Teo Halpern, lead a major reorganization of the College's composite schools.

- The School of American Studies merged with the School of Intercultural Studies to form the School of American and International Studies.
- One of the three schools that grew out of the School of Human Environment, Metropolitan and Community Studies, reorganized as the School of Social Science and Human Services.
- The remaining two derivative schools of Human Environment—Social Relations and Environmental Studies—dissolved, their faculties and programs largely transferred to the School of Social Science and Human Services and the School of Theoretical and Applied Science, respectively.

A number of faculty also transferred into the new School of Administration and Business, created by mandate of the board of trustees in the wake of sustained controversy and resistance on the part of much of the non-business faculty.

In addition, financial difficulties put the college in a position to reconsider the resource-intensive structure of general education and investigate effective new means to give students a liberal arts foundation. Many reports were produced by the faculty making recommendations for changes, some fairly extensive, but the debate was not yet over. Action would come in the late 1980s and throughout the 1990s under a new administration.

=== Potter's resignation and Silverman's initiatives ===
President Potter seemed unable to reconcile his earlier innovative ideas with changing student demands and a declining fiscal outlook. He did not produce "effective" results in campaigns to produce private contributions, and his formal long-term planning report was far behind schedule. In addition, his administration was pressured by the Department of Higher Education to execute several faculty cuts which proved very unpopular, and his administration's handling of a subordinate's sexual harassment charges and subsequent lawsuit was inept. Potter's increasing conflicts with the Department of Higher Education lead the Department to put pressure on the Board of Trustees to remove Potter. Board action seemed inevitable, as the Department was implicitly withholding funds for a desperately needed housing project. Potter resigned in February 1984.

The board of trustees had already made arrangements for the aftermath of Potter's departure. Sidney Silverman, a retired president of Bergen Community College, stepped in as interim president. Silverman took action to improve relations in the college community with the administration. Additionally, Silverman worked to comply with mandates from the Department of Higher Education regarding the College's finances. One of Silverman's proposal was to reduce the credit awarded for most classes from four to three credits. Under a three credit system, students would take more classes and professors would teach more courses on the same pay. The College, in turn, would save money by being able to reduce the number of adjunct professors. While the faculty bitterly protested this measure, the Board of Trustees, under pressure from the Department, felt it had no choice but to implement it.

== Consolidation ==
=== General education revisions and presidency of Robert Scott ===
During the meeting of the Faculty Assembly on April 24, 1985, the faculty voted to approve a new structure in general education, to be phased in over the next several years. The new structure mandated courses to ensure basic skills in freshman and to provide a liberal arts foundation to students on an all-college basis. This was to be accomplished through a series of freshman courses continued with several upper-level courses. While there was much to be left defined and room for revision, this basic structure would guide Ramapo general education for the next twenty-five years.

In the spring of 1985, the search committee for the new president ended and the Board of Trustees hired Robert Scott. Scott had been Director of Academic Affairs at the Indiana Commission for Higher Education. Scott would continue to serve the college through the end of the 1990s, presiding over a period of rising tuition, increased competition among colleges for students, and increased autonomy from the state. That being said, under Scott's tenure, Ramapo dramatically expanded its residential facilities, improved academic facilities, and increased student enrollment.
