= Handbibliothek des allgemeinen und praktischen Wissens =

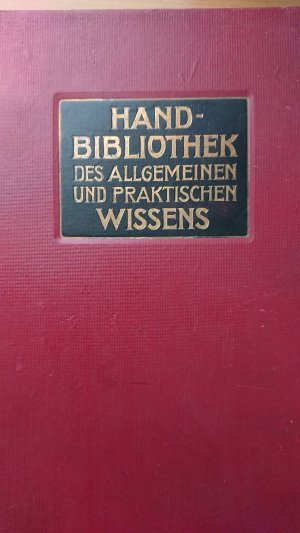

Handbibliothek des allgemeinen und praktischen Wissens (German for "Handbook of common and practical knowledge") is a series of two textbooks for self-education. Edited by Emanuel Müller-Baden, it was first published in Germany in 1920 by Deutsches Verlagshaus Bong & Co.

== Content ==
The first volume treats the German, French and English languages, and offers courses in handwriting and shorthand. But it also expands on subjects like engine construction and accounting. Volume two consists of lessons on natural science, geography, law and mathematics.
