= Max Talmey =

American ophthalmologist and educator

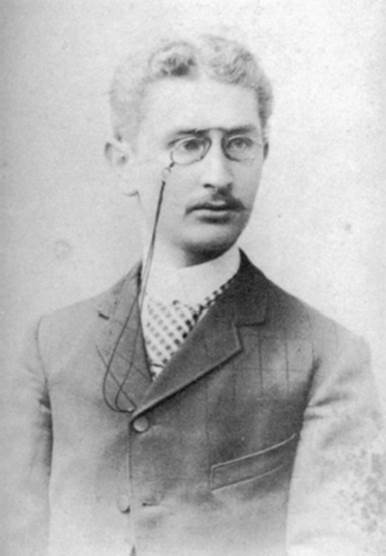
- Photo by E. Mulhern, c. 1890
- Born: Max Talmud; 1869; Tauroggen, Russian Empire (now Taurage, Lithuania)
- Died: November 7, 1941 (aged 71–72); New York City, U.S.
- Education: Munich Medical School
- Scientific career
- Fields: Medicine
- Workplaces: Mount Sinai Hospital
- Notable students: Albert Einstein

Max Talmey (born Max Talmud; Yiddish: מאַקס תלמוד; 1869 – November 7, 1941) was a Lithuanian-born American ophthalmologist and educator of Jewish descent, best known as Albert Einstein's tutor who introduced him to fields of and books on natural science and philosophy, for his success in treating cataracts, and for his work on auxiliary languages.

== Early life and education ==
Talmey was born in Tauroggen (now in Lithuania) near the Prussian border into a poor Jewish family. At 18, Talmey was fluent in six languages. Talmey studied medicine in Germany; his older brother, Bernard S. Talmey (1862-1926), was also a medical doctor.

== Tutoring Albert Einstein ==
Talmey was 21 when he first met Albert Einstein, who at the time was ten years old and on a third year of Luitpold Gymnasium. Talmey was then attending Medical School in Munich, Germany. For five years, from 1889 to 1894, Talmey was a weekly lunch guest of Einstein's family, as was Jewish custom. They used to discuss themes of interest to Albert Einstein, and Talmey lent him a number of books about science, including works on general science like multi-volume Popular Book on Natural Science by Aaron Bernstein; on physics like Force and Matter by Ludwig Buchner; on mathematics like Theodore Spieker's popular textbook on geometry for higher schools (Lehrbuch der ebenen Geometrie mit Übungsaufgaben für höhere Lehranstalten - Th. Spieker 1899/289), which was based on classic Euclid's Elements, and which he called "his holly little geometry book"; and philosophy, like The Critique of Pure Reason by Immanuel Kant. According to Talmey, "Kant's works, incomprehensible to ordinary mortals, seemed to be clear" for young Einstein. Many of those books were considered leading sources on their subjects, and at each meeting Einstein showed his mentor some of the problems he had solved that week. As Talmey recalled, teenage Einstein soon surpassed his mentor in mathematics and physics, and their discussions moved to philosophy.

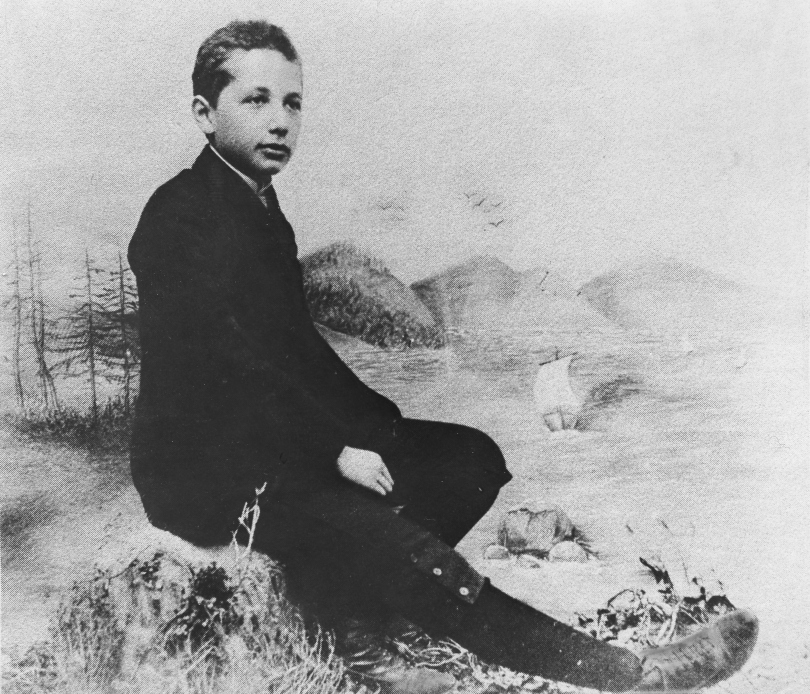
Albert Einstein in 1893 (age 14)

James G. Ravin quoted Talmey in his article:

Over forty years later, in 1931, Talmey described the situation to a New York Times reporter: "Although there was a difference of 11 years between us, the boy had such an aptitude and zest for knowledge that it was an easy matter to get along together. I lent him many of my scientific books and he mastered their contents in several months. He read one unusually difficult mathematical text in two months, whereas adult students require years for the same task". Talmey said that Albert "became so interested in mathematics and physics that he took a profound dislike for the methods of the school, concluded his studies were wasted there and devoted himself to self-education. Before long the youngster knew more about science than his mentor".

and:

Talmey gave him copies of scientific books that were well known in Germany. One set was Popular Books on Natural Science by Aaron Bernstein, which describe light, distance, astronomy, meteorology, and nutrition. Talmey found the writing lucid and engaging, and it impressed Albert. Thirty-two years later, when Einstein visited Talmey in New York, Talmey asked Einstein his opinion of the Bernstein text. Einstein replied "Bernstein's work is a very good book even now, and at that time it was the best of its kind. It has exerted a very great influence on my whole development."

...

Albert excelled in mathematics. While he was in his fourth year at the gymnasium, Talmey gave him a copy of a geometry textbook to study at home. The exposition and proof offered for every statement were wonderful revelations for Albert. The clarity and order of geometry contrasted with the disorderly world of his everyday experience.

Talmey graduated from the medical school in 1895, the same year Einsteins (family with their busieness, so the usual weekly lunches ceased; Albert stayed with another family in Munich intending to complete gymnasium) moved to Milan; they lost contact for seven years. They met in 1902 in Bern, and next time only in 1921.

Talmey published an account of Einstein's early life, "Personal Recollections of Einstein's Boyhood and Youth", in Scripta Mathematica. He also published an account of Einstein's Theory of Relativity.

== Medical career ==
After graduating from medical school in 1894, Talmey moved to the United States with his older brother, Bernard, who initially introduced him to Einstein's family and had graduated medical school two years earlier. Ravin wrote that:

The older Talmey was erudite and a frequent contributor to the medical literature. During the first few decades of this century, he was considered the foremost expert on human sexuality. His popular book, Love, A Treatise on the Science of Sex-Attraction for the Use of Physicians and Students of Medical Jurisprudence, went through ten editions.

As with young Einstein, Talmey's interests in medicine during his studies were broad; he then for a time also considered specializing in psychiatry. In New York, Max Talmey first had a general practice, including otorhinolaryngology and related work, and also published a textbook intended for medical and law students on psychology and psychiatry, an area that was not well covered at the time.

Soon he moved to Mount Sinai Hospital, from where he was mostly known as an ophthalmologist. He published papers on an ophthalmic topics, such as cataract surgery, corneal burns, and the differential diagnosis of optic neuritis. He also wrote scientific works on psychiatry, otology, and internal medicine.

According to Ravin:

Talmey loved controversy. He took on ophthalmologists, otorhinolaryngologists, Freudian psychiatrists, and even his own internist, in print. His 1905 attack on other ophthalmologists is entitled "Reflections concerning pretended therapeutic successes obtained by some practitioners of the ophthalmological specialty". Talmey wrote "Certain devotees of ophthalmology surpass those of any other specialty with their wonderful therapeutic achievements by the most simple means. Severe diseases that have persisted for years have been cured by a little operation lasting about fifteen minutes. Cutting of the external eye muscles has removed many ailments. In some instances the simplicity of the remedy for the cure of obstinate diseases that have baffled the skill of the internist and neurologist, is nothing short of marvelous".

Around the year 1917, Talmey observed a link between patients who had undergone a tonsillectomy and later developed polio. This was not acted upon until 1929, when several polio cases developed, with five children of the same family who had all recently received tonsillectomies. Three of those children died. As a result, the standard procedure was changed that year so tonsillectomies were no longer performed in the summer when most cases of polio developed. Today, physicians know tonsils are part of the body's immune system, including antibodies that prevent virus replication, and soon after their removal the body's task to overcome viral infections is harder.

In addition to his medical career, Talmey was a harsh critic of Freudian psychoanalysis.

== Universal language: Esperanto and Gloro ==
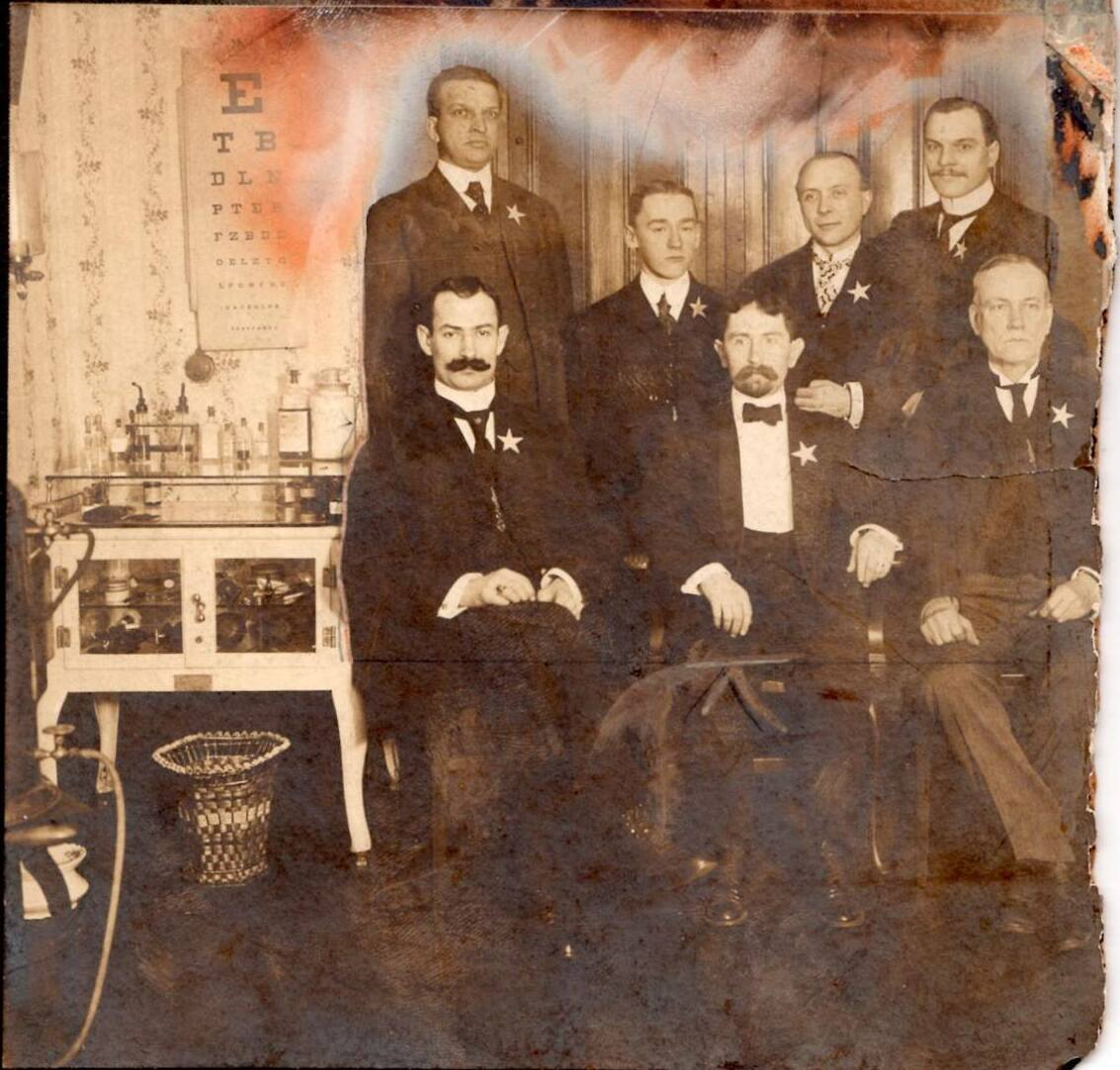
Esperanto Society of New York, ca. 1905-1908

Competent in several languages and aware of problems of exact translations, Talmey also supported the development of Esperanto, and claimed that he was the first who brought this language to the United States. In 1905 he founded the Esperanto Society of New York and became its first President. In 1906 he published the first grammar of Esperanto in the US, but by 1907 he became disappointed in the language and resigned from the Esperanto Society.

Talmey thought that Esperanto was flawed:

In a letter to the editor of the New York Times, he described some of the problems of universal languages. "I have been studying painstakingly the 300 years' history of an auxiliary language for twenty years. The auxiliary international language must be absolutely neutral and extremely easy to learn to write and to speak. These two requirements exclude all natural languages". He found two important faults with Esperanto. First, an international language must contain types that can be printed anywhere. However, Esperanto contains five unusual symbols that are not found in any natural language. Second, the international language must be mellifluous. "The sound of Esperanto is nothing short of repugnant". Although Esperanto had some success in practice, Talmey felt these defects doomed it.

After transitioning from Esperanto, Talmey started to embrace Ido, but soon lost interest in it. By 1924 Talmey constructed his own language, Arulo (Auxiliary Rational Universal Language), later renamed Gloro (gloto racionoza: rational language, so called in Gloro), which can be regarded as offspring of Esperanto and Novial. Talmey intended Gloro more as a "model language" for precise exchange of ideas, such as the explanation of relativity to laymen, than another general purpose international language like Esperanto. That exactness was to be achieved by the requirement that each word existing in Gloro has a precise and unique meaning. Thus multi-meaning words in natural languages, like solution in English, would have different distinct corresponding words in Gloro, one for each meaning. Talmey performed public readings of works translated into Gloro, which had similarities to Latin and Spanish. Talmey praised Gloro as a language of "extreme simplicity, no rules of grammar, and a pleasant sound".

Talmey presented Gloro in 1937 to the Jewish Club in New York:

Einstein was in the audience when Talmey introduced the language. The New York Times reported the event: "A new language was added last night to New York's babel of tongues when Dr. Max Talmey read parts of President Roosevelt's speech at Buenos Aires translated into Gloro". An example of Gloro was provided, along with an English translation: "The eye saw fields devastated and on them the war's many victims mutilated, slaughtered". ("La okulo vidis agri devastita e sur oli la militof mult viktimi mutilita okcidita".)

Walter Modell wrote in 1939:

Only two people can speak Gloro. One of them is a physician in Scranton, Pennsylvania, and the other is its inventor, Dr. Max Talmey of New York. Despite this paucity of users, Gloro need not be taken too lightly. It ranks importantly among synthetic tongues and is touted by its few by fervent champions as the language the combines the best features of all others.

Time described Gloro in 1937 and printed an excerpt in it: "Questa es nula konference por formacar alianci, por dividar la preduri di milito, por repartar landi, por traktar homa enti, velut se li esud la gaji in un ludo di hazardo. Nia skopo, sub fortunoza auspicii, es sikurigar la continuations dil prospero di paco." Its description reads: "In Gloro there are 18 suffix forms to denote different parts of speech, verb tenses, case endings. There are no other rules of grammar. It looks and sounds even more like a hodge-podge of Latin, Italian and Spanish than that more famed lingua franca, Esperanto, which it considerably resembles. Its roots were chosen with great care, however, from various languages, especially English."

Talmey died in 1941 in New York.

== Selected bibliography ==
Ido, Exhaustive Text Book of the International Language of the Delegation, and Fundamentals of an Artificial International Language, by Dr. Max Talmey, 1919.

Medicine

- Influenza or acute articular rheumatism? Their diagnosis with a report of my own illness. New York Med J 1904; 80: 496–498.
- Reflections concerning pretended therapeutic successes obtained by some practitioners of the ophthalmological specialty. New York Med J 1905; 82:1165
- A contribution to the study of pseudo-neuritis optica. New York Med J 1906; 83: 442.
- Corneal burn by direct flame. New York Med J 1907; 85: 974–976.
- A case of congenital cataract, successful operation at the age of 23 years. New York Med J 1910; 91 : 592.
- Psyche : a concise and easily comprehensible treatise on the elements of psychiatry and psychology for students of medicine and law. New York : Medico-Legal Pub. Co. 1910.
- Manic depressive insanity or recurrent insanity? New York Med J 1911; 93: 19–22.
- Bilateral optic pseudoneuritis and unilateral medullated nerve fibers in cranial injury by blunt force. Med Rec New York 1913; 84: 13–15.
- Predisposing factors in infantile paralysis. New York Med J 1916; 104: 202–204.
- Restoration of sight in a case of hypermature cataract of twenty years' standing, complicated by acute glaucoma. New York Med J 1917; 105: 401–406.
- Suggestions for improving the operation for cataract. New York Med J 1918; 107:1108-1114.
- Freud's psychoanalysis (letter). New York Sun Nov 8, 1939.

Einstein

- Einstein as a boy recalled by a friend. New York Times Feb 10, 1929; x, 11.
- Personal Recollections of Einstein's Boyhood and Youth. Scripta Mathematica, Sept. 1932, pp. 68–71
- The Relativity Theory Simplified. NY: Falcon Press, 1932; 163
- Talmey, Max (1932). "The Fundamentals of the Relativity Theory". The Scientific Monthly. 34 (1): 41–48. Bibcode:1932SciMo..34...41T. ISSN 0096-3771. JSTOR 15157.
- Talmey, Max (1932). "Einstein's Theory and Rational Language". The Scientific Monthly. 35 (3): 254–257. Bibcode:1932SciMo..35..254T. ISSN 0096-3771. JSTOR 15302.

Linguistics

- Practical and Theoretical Esperanto: A Handy Textbook for Beginners and Advanced Students, for Selfinstruction and Teaching Purposes, Containing Elementary Grammar Formation of Words, Complete Syntax and Exercises. Universal language Publishing Company. 1906.
- Defects of Esperanto, its decline and the growth of Ilo [microform] : an address delivered in the New York Ilo Society on the first meeting of the new year, January 21st, 1909. New York : Universal Language Pub. Co. 1909.
- Ido, Exhaustive Text Book of the International Language of the Delegation, and Fundamentals of an Artificial International Language. New York: Ido press. 1919.
  - New edition
- The Language Question (letter). New York Times Dec 3,1922, IX.
- Talmey, Max (1923). "The Problem of an Auxiliary International Language and Its Solution". The Scientific Monthly. 17 (4): 342–360. ISSN 0096-3771. JSTOR 3693068.
- Suplemento al Raporto XXVIII. Reflekti pril Universala Linguo e Nova Vorti, Ilo Press, 1925.
- Arulo. Text Book of the Universal Language, New York: Ilo Press, 1925.
- Lexikologio di Arulo - Sugestioni, New York: Ilo Press, 1927.
- Talmey, Max (1929). "Critical Remarks on Novial". The Modern Language Journal. 14 (3): 228–233. doi:10.2307/314381. ISSN 0026-7902. JSTOR 314381.
- Talmey, Max (1929). "Notes on a Model Language". The Scientific Monthly. 28 (4): 330–335. Bibcode:1929SciMo..28..330T. ISSN 0096-3771. JSTOR 14771.
- Talmey, Max (1930). "Word Composition in a Logical Language". The Modern Language Journal. 15 (3): 200–214. doi:10.2307/315597. ISSN 0026-7902. JSTOR 315597.
- Talmey, Max (1930). "Model Language and Essentials of Arulo". The Modern Language Journal. 14 (5): 386–395. doi:10.2307/314512. ISSN 0026-7902. JSTOR 314512.
- Talmey, Max (1938). "The Auxiliary Language Question". The Modern Language Journal. 23 (3): 172–186. doi:10.2307/317263. ISSN 0026-7902. JSTOR 317263.
- Talmey, Max (1940). "Word Derivation in a Logical Language". The Modern Language Journal. 24 (8): 617–628. doi:10.2307/317794. ISSN 0026-7902. JSTOR 317794.

Other

- A tribute to Dr. Bernard Simon Talmey. Am Med 1926; 32: 465-467
