= Jekuthiel Ginsburg =

American mathematician

Jekuthiel Ginsburg (1889–1957) was a professor of mathematics at Yeshiva University. He established the journal Scripta Mathematica. He also was honored as a fellow of the New York Academy of Sciences.
