= Intellectual need =

Intellectual need is a specific form of intrinsic motivation, defined as “a learner’s subjective need to address a problem by learning something new.” It is widely recognized as a critical factor in effective education and learning processes. Intellectual need emerges when an individual is confronted with a problem that generates a motivation either to satisfy curiosity or to resolve a specific issue.

Intellectual need is often greatest when there is a hole in an otherwise well-connected web of knowledge, where one has reached the limit of their knowledge and identified a knowledge gap. Merely understanding a question and being unable to answer it is not sufficient to create intellectual need—intellectual need arises when a person believes the question to be interesting or important, and usually this involves fitting the question into a framework of well-understood ideas.

Mathematics professor Guershon Harel argues for a difference between motivation and intellectual need, stating that intellectual need does not have to do with one's interest or desire but rather epistemology and one's engagement in problems leading to learning. He has formulated the Necessity Principle, which states: "For students to learn [what] we intend to teach them, they must have a need for it, where 'need' here refers to intellectual need."

A common critique of certain educational systems is that students are expected to learn facts and ideas in the absence of any intellectual need. As a result, the teachers and educational system must provide extrinsic motivation for the students in the form of tests, grades, or other incentives. This gives rise to a whole series of problems, ranging from boredom to academic dishonesty.

== Examples ==
- A student who asks a question is displaying an intellectual need for the question to be answered.
- A birdwatcher who cannot identify a certain bird will often have a strong intellectual need to identify that bird because it represents a hole in his or her knowledge; however, others might have no intellectual need, even though they also cannot identify the bird.
- One can cultivate intellectual need by giving students a problem they can easily understand but cannot solve, or a question they can understand but cannot answer, before introducing a technique that can be used to solve the problem or information that answers the question.
- If a student cannot understand a question or problem, it cannot provide intellectual need for a solution.
- Giving students a new technique to solve a problem will not be effective if the students are already able to solve the problem through other easier or more enjoyable techniques, because they will have no intellectual need for the new technique.

== See also ==
- Autodidacticism
- Curiosity
- Latent inhibition
