= List of autodidacts =

This is a list of notable people described as autodidacts by the media. An autodidact is someone who is partially or wholly self-taught. Some people listed may have received a formal education, including some college, but not in the fields in which they became prominent.

== Historical education levels ==
Because of the large increase in years of education since 1800, especially during the early 20th century, it is difficult to define autodidactism and to compare autodidacts during different time periods.

== Artists and authors ==
- Sardoine Mia, Congolese artist and painter
- Charlotte Perkins Gilman was a feminist writer, lecturer, and thinker at the turn of the 20th century
- Suzanne Valadon, self-taught artist of Bohemian Paris
- Sor Juana Inés de la Cruz, self-taught scholar and poet of New Spain
- Benjamin Kidd (1858–1916), British sociologist, was not given a formal education. As a working adult, he attended some evening classes and he read incessantly. Kidd gained worldwide fame by the publication of Social Evolution in 1894.
- Jorge Luis Borges was an Argentine writer, essayist, and poet. Winner of the Jerusalem Prize.
- Machado de Assis, often described as the greatest Brazilian writer, never attended a university and taught himself four foreign languages.
- Hermann Hesse, German-Swiss poet and novelist and Nobel laureate in literature
- Knut Hamsun, Norwegian writer and Nobel laureate
- Camilo José Cela, Spanish novelist, poet, story writer and essayist and Nobel laureate
- Eugene O'Neill, American playwright and Nobel laureate
- José Saramago, Nobel Prize for Literature. His parents were unable to pay for his studies at early age, and he was forced to abandon the baccalaureate. At the age of 13, he began to study mechanics to repair cars. He continued the next thirty years working as a locksmith for a metal company, and in an agency of social services. His first novel (Terra de pecado) was published in 1947 without any success at all. He stopped writing for publication, although he continued doing manuscripts for himself. At the end of the 1960s, he joined the Communist party, and after the fall of the Fascist dictatorship in Portugal of 1974, he was the director of the nationalized newspaper Diário de Notícias. Just a few years after the putsch of the left wing failed in 1975, he began to write again to survive. At this point, he began to receive more recognition for his work. In 1998 he won the Nobel Prize for Literature.
- Rabindranath Tagore, Nobel Prize for Literature. A Bengali polymath who reshaped his region's literature and music. Author of Gitanjali, he became the first non-European to win the Nobel Prize in Literature in 1913.
- William Blake was an English visionary artist and poet. He was initially educated by his mother prior to his enrollment in drawing classes but never received any formal schooling. Instead, he read widely on subjects of his own choosing.
- Sarah Josepha Hale was an American writer and editor of the most widely circulated magazine in the period before the Civil War, Godey's Lady's Book.
- John Clare was self-taught and rose out of poverty to become an acclaimed poet.
- Zakaria Tamer, a Syrian short story writer
- Charles Dickens' formal education stopped when he was fifteen years of age. He was an early supporter of self-education.
- G.V. Desani, British-Indian author and educator. His formal education ended in Sind, India (now Pakistan) when he was about thirteen years old.
- Henry Miller was a writer, expatriated in Paris at his flourishing. He was known for breaking with existing literary forms, developing a new type of semi-autobiographical novel that blended character study, social criticism, philosophical reflection, explicit language, sex, surrealist free association, and mysticism.
- Truman Capote was a novelist, screenwriter, playwright, and actor. Many of Capote's short stories, novels, plays, and nonfiction are recognized as literary classics, including the novella Breakfast at Tiffany's (1958) and the true crime novel In Cold Blood (1966), which he labeled a "nonfiction novel". At least 20 films and television dramas have been produced from Capote novels, stories, and plays.
- Poerbatjaraka, an Indonesian self-taught philologist and professor, specialising in Javanese literature.
- Jack London was a novelist, journalist, and social activist. A pioneer in the world of commercial magazine fiction, he was one of the first writers to become a worldwide celebrity and earn a large fortune from writing. He was also an innovator in the genre that would later become known as science fiction.
- Joseph Conrad, regarded as one of the greatest novelists to write in the English language. Though he did not speak English fluently until his twenties, he was a master prose stylist who brought a non-English sensibility into English literature.
- William Faulkner, Nobel Prize for Literature. Dropped out of college.
- Forensic facial reconstruction artist Frank Bender was self-taught. His forensic career started off with a day trip to a morgue, asked to try to put a face on the deceased, brought measurements home, created a successful facial reconstruction that led to his first (of many) IDs. He took only one semester of sculpture at the Pennsylvania Academy of the Fine Arts.
- Harlan Ellison, multi-award-winning speculative fiction author and screenwriter. Ellison attended Ohio State University for 18 months before being expelled for hitting a professor who criticized his writing, and claimed that for over 20 years thereafter, he sent the professor a copy of every work he published. Ellison wrote screenplays for a wide variety of television series such as Star Trek and The Man from U.N.C.L.E. and won dozens of awards in the science fiction and fantasy genres.
- Howard Phillips Lovecraft, weird fiction writer and primogenitor of modern horror fiction, was a self-taught writer, critic and commentator. A pronounced child prodigy by the time he was of primary school age, reading memorized verse not long after learning how to walk, and composing and writing his own poetry by the time he was six. Growing up, Lovecraft attended school only in brief stints, his ill-health ending all scholastic endeavors prematurely. During this time Lovecraft read constantly, gifted with an abnormal talent for reading comprehension. Some of his favorite subjects were astronomy and chemistry, about both of which he went on to write amateur pieces of commentary and criticism. Not long after developing a great interest in the pulp magazines of his day, he began writing fiction himself—eventually becoming a preeminent writer of weird fiction in the pulp press, his work appearing in magazines such as Weird Tales and Astounding Stories.
- David Hume, philosopher, historian, economist and a prominent figure of the Scottish Enlightenment, dropped out of college.
- Maxim Gorky was a self-taught man who rose out of poverty to become a world-famous writer.
- Mukul Deva, a well-known Indian writer, keynote speaker and coach has been engaged in self-directed learning.
- Jose Carlos Mariategui, the most important Marxist thinker in Latin America, due to a chronic illness was absent from a proper education, both school and university. However, he changed the lack of formal studies into an advantage and developed a self-taught capacity, which made him a voracious reader contributing to mature promptly, as he would later say, from an "ephemeral childhood" to a "premature adolescence".
- Nazir Naji, a top Pakistani Urdu news columnist and intellectual best known for his progressive writings has never attended any formal school because of the abject poverty of his parents. He has been in journalism for 50 years, started many popular magazines including Akhbar-e-Jehan and also served as the speech writer for the former Pakistani Prime Minister Nawaz Sharif.
- Sir Terry Pratchett, a writer of science fiction, fantasy and children's books, is quoted as saying "I didn't go to university. Didn't even finish A-levels. But I have sympathy for those who did."
- Julio Cortázar was a novelist, short story writer, and essayist. Known as one of the founders of the Latin American Boom. Cortázar influenced an entire generation of Spanish-speaking readers and writers in the Americas and Europe.
- Mark Twain, a self-taught writer. Faulkner called him "the father of American literature."
- Herman Melville, a writer best known for Moby Dick engaged in self-directed learning through his life in literature, aesthetics, criticism and art.
- Playwright August Wilson dropped out of school in the ninth grade but continued to educate himself by spending long hours reading at Pittsburgh's Carnegie Library.
- Playwright George Bernard Shaw, Nobel Prize for Literature. He left formal education while still in his mid-teens to become a clerk at an estate firm. He compared schools to prison and said that "I did not learn anything at school."
- Ernest Hemingway, Nobel Prize for Literature. The American novelist and short story writer, was primarily self-educated after high school. "... he read for hours at a time in bed", recounted his sister Marcelline. "He read everything around the house—all the books, all the magazines, even the AMA Journals from Dad's office downstairs. Ernie also took out great numbers of books from the public library." His father wanted him to go to Oberlin for college, but Hemingway decided to become a reporter for the Kansas City Star.
- Louis L'Amour, an author who left his home at the age of 15 to expand his horizons and worked many jobs while educating himself.
- J.A. Rogers, the Jamaican-American author, was able to educate himself after receiving only a few years' worth of primary education in Jamaica. He attended but never completed high school. While he was able to study commercial art at the Chicago Art Institute later in life, he got most of his knowledge in libraries and was able to produce many books based on race, history, sociology, and anthropology. He also mastered other languages such as Spanish, German, and French.
- Ray Bradbury, author of fantasy, horror, science fiction, and mystery novels, graduated from high school but did not attend college.
- Rudolph Dirks, one of the earliest and most noted comic strip artists, was an autodidact. He sold his first cartoon to a local newspaper when he was 13. For a while, he mainly designed ads. At 17 years old, he sold cartoons to magazines like Life and Judge. With jobs like cover images for pulp novels he made his living until the New York Journal hired him, where he earned fame as creator of The Katzenjammer Kids.
- Affandi (c. 1907 – 23 May 1990), an Indonesian painter.
- Alan Moore, creator of the graphic novels V for Vendetta and Watchmen.
- Wally Wood, artist and comic book writer, best known for his work on EC Comic's Mad and Marvel's Daredevil. Dropped out of college
- Frida Kahlo, painter, who is best known for her self-portraits. After a bus accident she painted to occupy her time during her temporary immobilization; after this accident she abandoned the study of medicine to begin painting.
- Jean Michel Basquiat, painter and graffiti artist. At 15 ran away from home and in this time dropped out of school.
- L. Ron Hubbard, American author and the founder of the Church of Scientology. After establishing a career as a writer, becoming best known for his science fiction and fantasy stories, he developed a controversial notion called Dianetics.
- Gert Verhulst is a Belgian presenter, entrepreneur, singer, songwriter, autodidact, director, actor, screenwriter, composer, film producer, millionaire & business magnate. As a prominent figure within the children's entertainment industry in the Benelux, he is regarded as a Belgian cultural icon, known for his influence and contributions to children's entertainment in the Benelux and founder of Studio 100. In 1987, he applied at the Koninkijk Conservatorium Antwerpen (The Royal Academy of fine Arts Antwerp) where he was rejected. He would recall this as a gift from Heaven.
- Billy Corgan wrote and performed the song "Half-Life of an Autodidact" on his album Ogilala, apparently referencing himself in the song.
- Vincent van Gogh was a mostly self-taught painter.
- Clark Ashton Smith, self-taught poet and fantasy author.
- Ivan Baran, Croatian writer.
- George Orwell, English novelist, essayist and journalist.
- Henk Ngantung, Indonesian painter and politician of Minahasan descent.
- Ingrid Hornef, painter and sculptor.

== Actors, musicians, and other artists ==
- Eddie Van Halen. "He was an autodidact who could play almost any instrument, but he couldn't read music. He was a classically trained pianist who also created some of the most distinctive guitar riffs in rock history."
- Claudio Arrau, 20th-century virtuoso pianist. He was highly regarded as an intellectual despite his lack of formal education outside his musical training. Arrau spoke five languages, four of which he learned on his own in addition to his native Spanish: English, German, French, and Italian.
- Ornette Coleman, Pulitzer Prize-winning jazz composer. Coleman taught himself to play the alto saxophone when he was a teenager, and later as an adult, taught himself to play the trumpet and violin.
- Feodor Chaliapin.
- Frank Zappa, musician. Noted for his exhortation, "Drop out of school before your mind rots from exposure to our mediocre educational system. Forget about the Senior Prom and go to the library and educate yourself if you've got any guts. Some of you like Pep rallies and plastic robots who tell you what to read."
- Arnold Schoenberg called himself an autodidact in an interview. Other largely self-taught composers include notably Hans Zimmer, Danny Elfman, Havergal Brian, Nobuo Uematsu, Joachim Raff, Kaikhosru Shapurji Sorabji, Bohuslav Martinů,
- Heitor Villa-Lobos, a prolific composer, he wrote numerous orchestral, chamber, instrumental and vocal works, totaling over 2000 works by his death in 1959.
- Stephen Foster, American songwriter. He has been nicknamed the "Father of American music."
- Jesper Kyd, composer and sound designer. He is mostly self-taught.
- Many successful filmmakers did not attend, or dropped out of, college and/or film school. These include Luis Buñuel, Ingmar Bergman, Peter Jackson, Orson Welles, Stanley Kubrick, John Huston, Woody Allen, Dario Argento, Quentin Tarantino, David Fincher, Steven Soderbergh, Christopher Nolan, James Cameron, Steven Spielberg, Richard Linklater, Werner Herzog, Kevin Smith, Jim Jarmusch, Wes Anderson, and Pedro Almodóvar.
- Mikhail Krichman, Russian cinematographer. Taught himself cinematography through reading technical magazines and books and watching films.
- Craig Ferguson, host of TV's The Late Late Show with Craig Ferguson on CBS. He first rose to fame in America as Nigel Wick on The Drew Carey Show, quit high school in his native Scotland at the minimum legal age to do so, 16. He continued his education, "haphazard and informal", through American, European and Russian literature. In his autobiography, American on Purpose, he identifies himself as an autodidact—although a dilettante one (see the article on Jean-Paul Sartre's Nausea).
- Penn Jillette, a member of the comedy and magic duo Penn & Teller, declared both himself and his partner Teller to be autodidacts in an episode of their television series, Penn & Teller: Bullshit!.
- Keith Moon, the drummer for the rock band The Who. The only training he ever received was at 16 years old when he had three or four drum lessons with Carlo Little (an early member of the Rolling Stones), who was also a self-taught drummer.
- Mark E. Smith
- Christopher Hughes, the winner of Mastermind, International Mastermind, Brain of Britain, and a current member of crack TV quiz team the Eggheads is almost entirely self-educated. After leaving Enfield Grammar School at 15 he spent all his life working on the railways in the capacity of driver or station master. He is one of only four people ever to have won both Mastermind and Brain of Britain. On a couple of occasions on Eggheads he has referred to himself as "The Autodidact's Autodidact".
- Ameer Hamza Shinwari, modern Pashto poet. Though not educated in the regular manner, he was able to establish his career through self-education.
- Robert Lewis Shayon, early radio producer, author, television critic for Christian Science Monitor and The Saturday Review, and Ivy League professor, never had a college education.
- David Bowie, singer, musician, multi-instrumentalist, actor, and painter. Only received a few singing lessons in the 1960s (as reported by his former manager, Ken Pitt). As a teenager he took some lessons on saxophone by Ronnie Ross. All other instruments (including piano, keyboards/synths, electric/acoustic guitar, harmonica, koto, limited bass, and percussion), he taught himself. His paintings and sculptures were created (and exhibited) without any formal art school training. He took a few lessons in movement and dance with the Lindsey Kemps Dance company but trained himself in mime.
- Jimi Hendrix was an influential self-taught electric guitarist and singer-songwriter.
- Kurt Cobain, lead singer and guitarist for Nirvana, was self-taught on guitar.
- Noel Gallagher, singer, musician, multi-instrumentalist. At the age of thirteen, Noel received six months probation for theft from a corner shop. It was during this period of probation, with little else to do, that Noel first began to teach himself to play a guitar his father had left him, imitating his favourite songs from the radio.
- Andy DiGelsomina, composer and lead guitarist of the rock opera Lyraka. When asked in an interview whether he had taught himself music composition, DiGelsomina replied, "Yes. I first taught myself the music reading, harmony, and fugue basics, then found myself especially motivated to read full orchestral scores because of (Richard) Wagner."
- Charles G. Dawes was a self-taught pianist and composer and a member of Phi Mu Alpha Sinfonia, the national fraternity for men in music. His 1912 composition, "Melody in A Major", became a well-known piano and violin piece, and was played at many official functions as his signature tune. It was transformed into the pop song, "It's All in the Game", in 1951 when Carl Sigman added lyrics.
- Errol Flynn
- Django Reinhardt was a highly influential jazz guitarist and composer, regarded as one of the most virtuosic and revered guitarists of all time despite a permanent injury of his left hand, limiting the use of two of his fingers.
- Jeff Loomis, guitarist and composer, known from the band Nevermore, is a self-taught guitarist. He has stated in interviews that he took few lessons in his youth but "didn't do much".
- Erroll Garner, jazz pianist and virtuoso who never learned to read music.
- Dave Grohl, drummer and guitarist from Nirvana, stated he never took music lessons, for drums nor guitar.
- Nasir Jones, hip-hop legend, better known as Nas, dropped out of school at seventh grade. Born and raised in the Queensbridge Houses in Queens, New York City, Nas is self-taught in all the major academic areas of history, philosophy, science, math, English.
- Marshall Mathers, hip-hop superstar better known as Eminem, dropped out of high school at age 17 and had to repeat ninth grade multiple times. He has gone on record as saying that his ability of rhyming comes from his love of studying other hiphop artists ( Such as Beastie Boys, L.L. Cool J., Dr. Dre, and several other artists), as well as reading the dictionary front to back multiple times to expand his vocabulary and use of multi-syllabic words.
- Ryo Fukui (福居良, Fukui Ryō; [ɸɯ.kɯꜜi ɾʲoː]; June 1, 1948 – March 15, 2016), a Japanese Jazz Pianist based in Sapporo.
- Noël Coward was an English playwright, composer, director, actor and singer.
- Paul Gray, bassist, co-founder and songwriter for the Grammy Award-winning band Slipknot stated "I am self-taught, never took any lessons".
- Henri Rousseau
- Bruce Springsteen is self-taught in multiple musical instruments, including guitar and piano, and has been a voracious reader since encouragement was given to follow this direction by manager Jon Landau in the mid-late 1970s. His only further education was a brief period of time spent at Ocean County Community College.
- Russell Crowe was intending to apply to the National Institute of Dramatic Art. "I was working in a theatre show, and talked to a guy who was then the head of technical support at NIDA", Crowe has recalled. "I asked him what he thought about me spending three years at NIDA. He told me it'd be a waste of time. He said, 'You already do the things you go there to learn, and you've been doing it for most of your life, so there's nothing to teach you but bad habits.'"
- Tōru Takemitsu (武満 徹; pronounced [takeꜜmitsɯ̥ toːɾɯ]; 8 October 1930 – 20 February 1996), a Japanese composer of contemporary classical music and writer on music.
- Neil Peart, drummer and lyricist for progressive rock band Rush. Dropped out of high school but became a voracious reader which led to him being chosen to be the main lyricist for the band. He wrote seven non-fiction books and collaborated with science fiction author Kevin J. Anderson on two graphic novels and one short story.
- Matty Healy, singer-songwriter, record producer, multi-instrumentalist, and frontman of the 1975 who left school with two GCSEs and did not attend university, streaming lectures on YouTube instead.

== Architects ==
- Desmond Rea O'Kelly (7 November 1923 – 18 February 2011) was the architect of Liberty Hall in Dublin. Liberty Hall was formerly the tallest office building in Ireland, rising to 59.4 metres (195 feet).
- Eileen Gray (9 August 1878 – 31 October 1976) was an Irish furniture designer and architect and a pioneer of the Modern Movement in architecture.
- Francis Barry Byrne (19 December 1883 – 18 December 1967) was initially a member of the group of architects known as the Prairie School. After the demise of the Prairie School about 1914–16, Byrne continued as a successful architect by developing his own personal style.
- Frank Lloyd Wright (born Frank Lincoln Wright, 8 June 1867 – 9 April 1959) was an American architect, interior designer, writer and educator, who designed more than 1,000 projects, which resulted in more than 500 completed works.
- Gustave Eiffel (15 December 1832 – 27 December 1923) was a French structural engineer from the École Centrale Paris, an architect, an entrepreneur and a specialist of metallic structures.
- Horace Trumbauer (1868–1938) was known for his mansions and institutional buildings of the American "Gilded Age". His only formal training was as an apprentice with the firm of G.W. Hewitt.
- Iannis Xenakis (Greek: Ιωάννης Ιάννης Ξενάκης) (29 May 1922 – 4 February 2001) – ethnic Greek, naturalized French composer, music theorist, and architect-engineer.
- Jacque Fresco (13 March 1916 - May 18, 2017) – self-educated architectural designer, social engineer, industrial designer, author, lecturer, futurist, inventor, and the creator of The Venus Project.
- Jean Prouvé (8 April 1901 – 23 March 1984) – French metal worker and designer. His main achievement was transferring manufacturing technology from industry to architecture, without losing aesthetic qualities.
- Le Corbusier (6 October 1887 – 27 August 1965) – Swiss architect, designer, urbanist, writer and painter, famous for being one of the pioneers of what now is called Modernist architecture or the International style.
- Léon Krier (born 7 April 1946 in Luxembourg) – architect, architectural theorist and urban planner. From the late 1970s onwards Krier has been one of the most influential neo-traditional architects and planners, being one of the first and most prominent critics of architectural modernism.
- Ludwig Mies van der Rohe (27 March 1886 – 17 August 1969) – German-American architect. He was commonly referred to and addressed by his surname, Mies, by his colleagues, students, writers, and others.
- Luis Barragán (Guadalajara, 9 March 1902 – Mexico City, 22 November 1988) – considered the most important Mexican architect of the 20th century and was self-trained.
- Michael Scott (24 June 1905 – 24 January 1989) – Irish architect whose buildings included the Busáras building in Dublin, the Abbey Theatre, and Tullamore Hospital.
- Peter Behrens (14 April 1868 – 27 February 1940) – German architect and designer.
- Sunay Erdem (born 17 March 1971) – Turkish architect and landscape architect.
- Tadao Ando (安藤 忠雄, Andō Tadao, born 13 September 1941, in Osaka, Japan) – Japanese architect whose approach to architecture was once categorized as critical regionalism.
- Timothy L. Pflueger (1892–1946) – San Francisco-based architect known for his Art Deco skyscrapers and movie palaces. No formal architecture schooling.
- Viollet-le-Duc (1814–1879) – French architect and theorist, famous for his "restorations" of medieval buildings.

== Engineers and inventors ==
- Leonardo da Vinci was an Italian polymath: painter, sculptor, architect, musician, scientist, mathematician, engineer, inventor, anatomist, geologist, botanist, and writer. However, Leonardo was not autodidactic in his study of the arts, as he was trained through the Guild system, just as other Renaissance artists had been.
- John Smeaton was the first civil engineer.
- James Watt, the mechanical engineer who improved the steam engine, was "largely self-taught."
- Oliver Evans trained as a millwright, inventor of the high pressure steam engine (independently of Richard Trevithick and with a more practical engine). Evans developed and patented the first known automated materials-handling system.
- Thomas Alva Edison was an American inventor and businessman, who has been described as America's greatest inventor. He developed many devices that greatly influenced life around the world, including the phonograph, the motion picture camera, and the long-lasting, practical electric light bulb.
- Nikola Tesla, electrical engineer and inventor best known for his contributions to the design of the modern alternating current (AC) electricity supply system, never graduated from university.
- The Wright Brothers, especially Wilbur Wright. Neither brother graduated from high school nor attended college. Wilbur in fact had completed all the course requirements, but his family moved to Ohio in 1885 before graduation. Both brothers were mechanically inclined, with Orville running his own printing press in his teens. They entered the bicycle business as a team in 1892, selling existing models and creating their own brand, the Van Cleve, named after a relative. Wilbur made the first inroads in seriously studying aeronautics and the development of the world's first successful airplane.
- John Harrison, a carpenter by education, built the first marine chronometers enabling navigators to determine a ship's longitudinal position.
- Étienne Lenoir, engineer and inventor
- R. G. LeTourneau, prolific inventor of earthmoving machinery.
- Granville T. Woods, an inventor in electrical and mechanical engineering with more than 50 patents, only went to school until he was ten years old. Learning on the job, he began as a blacksmith's apprentice and continued as a machinist, an electrician, a railroad fireman, a locomotive and steamship engineer. In his free time, he kept reading, especially on the subjects of electricity and mechanics. During the 1860s and 1870s, because he was black, he was not allowed to borrow books from the local libraries so he would ask white friends to borrow them for him. Every time he saw a new piece of technology, he would ask questions about it. Years later, in an 1886 cross-examination for a patent dispute, he said that he was self-taught.
- Konstantin E. Tsiolkovsky, a Russian and Soviet rocket scientist and pioneer of the astronautic theory, who is considered to be one of the founding fathers of rocketry and astronautics. He was not admitted to elementary schools because of his hearing problem, so he was self-taught.
- Yuri Kondratyuk, a Ukrainian and Soviet engineer, pioneer of space exploration, rocketry and astronautics. He did not receive formal education because of persecution by Bolsheviks, forcing him to permanently change his identity to protect himself.
- Henry Ford, billionaire founder of Ford Motor Company, did not attend college.
- Oliver Heaviside who was an electrical engineer, mathematician, and physicist, developed mathematical techniques to solve differential equations, expressed Maxwell's equations in vector notation, and made significant contributions to transmission line theory. He had no formal education beyond his sixteenth year.
- Alicia Boole Stott was an Irish-English mathematician. Despite never holding an academic position, she made a number of valuable contributions to the mathematical field, receiving an honorary doctorate from the University of Groningen

== Scientists, historians, and educators ==
- Melanie Klein, the founding mother of children's psychology
- Francis Edgeworth, a self-taught economist.
- Blaise Pascal, a mathematician, philosopher, physicist and inventor who was home-schooled.
- Nathaniel Bowditch, a Colonial-period American mathematician who wrote the American Practical Navigator.
- Paul-Émile Lecoq de Boisbaudran, chemist, discoverer of several elements, pioneer in the field of spectroscopy.
- Galileo Galilei, astronomer, engineer, mathematician and physicist. Dropped out of college.
- Hermann Grassmann, polymath
- Michael Faraday, a chemist and physicist. Although Faraday received little formal education and knew little of higher mathematics, such as calculus, he was one of the most influential scientists in history. Some historians of science refer to him as the best experimentalist in the history of science.
- George Boole was a largely self-taught mathematician, philosopher and logician, most of whose short career was spent as the first professor of mathematics at Queen's College, Cork, Ireland. He worked in the fields of differential equations and algebraic logic, and is best known as the author of The Laws of Thought (1854) which contains Boolean algebra. Boolean logic is credited with laying the foundations for the information age.
- Mary Everest Boole was known for introducing mathematics as fun for children. Mother of Alicia Boole Stott.
- André-Marie Ampère was a physicist and mathematician who was one of the founders of the science of classical electromagnetism, which he referred to as "electrodynamics". He is also the inventor of numerous applications, such as the solenoid (a term coined by him) and the electrical telegraph.
- G.V. Desani, British-Indian author, lecturer and tenured Philosophy professor at the University of Texas at Austin (1968–79). His formal education ended in Sind, India (now Pakistan) when he was about thirteen years old.
- Benjamin Franklin, American Founding Father, polymath, politician, inventor, scientist, printer, publisher, diplomat, statesman, and writer.
- Leo Frobenius, a German ethnologist and archaeologist, who, after not finishing high school, spent his life researching and documenting the history of indigenous cultures.
- Buckminster Fuller, a self-proclaimed comprehensive anticipatory design scientist, was twice expelled from Harvard and, after a life-altering experience while on the edge of suicide, dedicated his life to working in the service of humanity and thinking for himself. In the process he created many new terms such as ephemeralization, dymaxion, and Spaceship Earth.
- Thomas Henry Huxley, a 19th-century British scientist and "Darwin's Bulldog".
- Jane Jacobs wrote books about city planning, economics, and sociology with only a high school degree and training in journalism and stenography, plus courses at Columbia University's extension school.
- Igor Kurchatov, a Soviet physicist educated as a naval architect, but who was an autodidact in nuclear physics
- Antonie van Leeuwenhoek, a cloth merchant, built the most powerful microscopes of his time and used them to make biological discoveries. He was largely self-taught in science and is considered to be "the Father of Microbiology."
- Gottfried Wilhelm Leibniz was a mathematical autodidact.
- Artemas Martin editor of the Mathematical Visitor in 1877 and of the Mathematical Magazine in 1882.
- Karl Marx, the German communist philosopher, was self-taught in economics, during his study in London, at the British Library.
- Lewis Mumford, American historian, sociologist, philosopher of technology, and literary critic, studied at the City College of New York and The New School for Social Research, but became ill with tuberculosis and never finished his degree.
- Lu Jiaxi (simplified Chinese: 陆家羲; traditional Chinese: 陸家羲; pinyin: Lù Jiāxī; June 10, 1935 – October 31, 1983), a self-taught Chinese mathematician who made important contributions in combinatorial design theory.
- Stanford R. Ovshinsky, scientist and inventor, had no college education.
- Walter Pitts, a cognitive scientist, was an autodidact. He taught himself mathematical logic, psychology, and neuroscience. He was one of the scientists who laid the foundations of cognitive sciences, artificial intelligence, and cybernetics.
- Srinivasa Ramanujan, a mathematician, was largely self-taught in mathematics. Ramanujan is notable as an autodidact for having developed thousands of new mathematical theorems despite having no formal education in mathematics, contributing substantially to the analytical theory of numbers, elliptic functions, continued fractions, and infinite series.
- Vincent J. Schaefer, who discovered the principle of cloud seeding, was schooled to 10th grade when asked by parents to help with family income. He continued his informal education by reading, participation in free lectures by scientists and exploring nature through year-round outdoor activity.
- Heinrich Schliemann, German businessman and archeologist.
- Herbert Spencer, a social philosopher and 19th-century British scientist.
- Alfred Russel Wallace (co-discoverer of natural selection) and Henry Walter Bates, both 19th-century British scientists and natural historians.
- Gerda Alexander, Heinrich Jacoby, and a number of other 20th-century European innovators worked out methods of self-development that stressed intelligent sensitivity and awareness.
- Eliezer Yudkowsky, AI safety researcher and decision-theorist.
- Eric Hoffer, philosopher and social critic; awarded the Presidential Medal of Freedom by President Reagan.
- William Kamkwamba, inventor.
- George Green, mathematician and physicist.
- Sequoyah, polymath and inventor of the Cherokee syllabary
- Robert Franklin Stroud, ornithologist while imprisoned.
- James Marcus Bach, software testing expert.
- Steve Irwin, Australian herpetologist, conservationist, TV personality and general animal expert, never went to college and primarily learned everything he knew about biology and zoology from teaching himself and from his father.
- Joseph Needham was originally schooled as a biochemist, but later in life became an autodidact sinologist. He edited and contributed to the enormous body of work known as Science and Civilisation in China.
- Vasily Vladimirovich Petrov, Russian scientist
- Clyde Tombaugh, American astronomer who discovered Pluto.
- Benjamin West, American astronomer, mathematician, professor at Rhode Island College, and publisher of several series of North American almanacs.
- Mary Anning, an amateur palaeontologist. Her findings contributed to important changes in scientific thinking about prehistoric life and the history of the Earth.
- Wang Zhenyi (simplified Chinese: 王贞仪; traditional Chinese: 王貞儀; pinyin: Wáng Zhēnyí; 1768–1797; styled Deqing (德卿)), also known as the Jinling and Jiangning Lady Historian (金陵女史), a Chinese scientist from the Qing Dynasty.
- Caroline Herschel was an astronomer who discovered many comets.
- Amos Tversky was a mathematical psychologist with no formal schooling in mathematics.
- James Croll, FRS, 19th-century Scottish scientist.
- George Smith, Assyriologist who discovered and deciphered the Gilgamesh epic in 1872, without any university or other higher education.
- Annie Trumbull Slosson, entomologist and writer of fiction.
- Amelia Laskey, ornithologist.
- Agnes Pockels, German chemist whose research was fundamental to establishing modern surface science.
- Niccolò Fontana Tartaglia, a self-taught mathematician.
- Richard Feynman, a physicist who, at the age of 15, taught himself trigonometry, advanced algebra, infinite series, analytic geometry, and both differential and integral calculus.
- Albert Einstein was a physicist, who taught himself algebra, Euclidean geometry, and calculus when he was 12. He also independently discovered his own original proof of the Pythagorean theorem, and he had worked through a geometry textbook he was given by his family tutor, Max Talmud. When Einstein was 14 years old, he says he had "mastered integral and differential calculus".
- Charles Henry Davis was a self-educated American astronomer and rear admiral of the United States Navy. He was one of the founders of the National Academy of Sciences and he wrote many scientific books.
- Hua Luogeng was a self-taught Chinese mathematician.
- Yakov Zeldovich, a Soviet physicist of Belarusian origin
- J. B. S. Haldane, a central figure in the modern synthesis of evolutionary thought and pioneer of mathematical biology

== Others ==
- Peter Fraser, Scottish-born Prime Minister of New Zealand whose attendance at school was interrupted at an early age by the need to contribute to the family income.
- Adam Malik Batubara (22 July 1917 – 5 September 1984), an Indonesian politician, diplomat, and journalist, who served as the third vice president of Indonesia from 1978 until 1983
- Chen Guangcheng (born 1971), a Chinese civil rights activist who has worked on human rights issues in rural areas of the People's Republic of China.
- Eliezer Shlomo Yudkowsky (born 1979), an American artificial intelligence researcher and writer on decision theory and ethics, known for popularizing ideas related to friendly artificial intelligence.
- Amadeo Giannini, multimillionaire founder of Bank of America. Dropped out of high school.
- Travis Kalanick, American billionaire. Dropped out of college.
- William Zeckendorf was a prominent real estate developer. Through his development company Webb and Knapp—for which he began working in 1938 and which he purchased in 1949—he developed a significant portion of the New York City urban landscape.
- Kató Lomb, one of the first simultaneous interpreters in the world, spoke more than ten languages fluently and she learned them by gleaning their rules and vocabulary from books (mostly novels), as she described in her book Polyglot: How I Learn Languages (2008), originally published in Hungarian in four editions (1970, 1972, 1990, 1995).
- Jakob Böhme
- Rodney Mullen established his reputation in the sport of freestyle skateboarding. His autodidactism led to significant and long-standing innovations in skateboarding, such as the flatground ollie and the kickflip, both staples of modern skateboarding.
- Sean Parker, Internet entrepreneur and former President of Facebook, Inc. As of 2010, his net worth is nearly two billion USD.
- Publilius Syrus, classics writer who is often quoted for his seminal Latin work Sentences. He started his life as a slave, but eventually won his freedom.
- Frederick Douglass, an American abolitionist, women's suffragist, editor, orator, author, statesman, minister and reformer. He was and is one of the most renowned figures in United States history.
- Booker T. Washington started his life as a slave, but he was an African American leader. He advocated self-help and entrepreneurship to overcome racial injustice.
- Malcolm X, a one-time Black Muslim minister who late in his shortened life rejected that philosophy and became an adherent of the Sunni Islam branch of Islam, public speaker, and human rights activist, taught himself about subjects from genetics to sociology to philosophy. He also copied a dictionary word-for-word while in prison for seven years, thus expanding his vocabulary himself.
- WikiLeaks founder Julian Assange was kept from school by his mother, who thought it would "inculcate an unhealthy respect for authority in her children and dampen their will to learn."
- Christopher Langan, independent researcher and scholar with IQ reportedly between 195 and 210. Dropped out of college and worked as a bouncer on Long Island before being discovered.
- Abraham Lincoln, American president
- Harry S. Truman, American president
- Heston Blumenthal, chef, author and TV presenter
- Adolf Hitler, Nazi chancellor of Germany; was self-educated beyond early education through libraries (primarily in Vienna and parts of Austria).
- Henry Knox, American Revolutionary War general and commander of continental artillery. Knox had been an owner of a bookstore before the war and had taught himself French and the principles of period artillery out of his own general interest.
- J. B. Fuqua, American businessman and philanthropist, who in his youth studied business practices from books sent to his farm by mail from Duke University library. The Fuqua School of Business, one of the top business schools in the United States, is named in his honor.
- Paul Keating, former Australian treasurer and prime minister. Keating left school at 15 years of age and was elected to Parliament when he was 25 years old. He is credited with opening up Australia's economy by bringing in various microeconomic reforms as treasurer and setting up APEC's annual leaders meetings, pursuing Aboriginal reconciliation and forging closer ties with Australia's near Asian neighbors whilst prime minister.
- Ferdinand Waldo Demara, American con man, noted as "The Great Imposter".
- Steve Jobs dropped out of Reed College after a year and eventually started Apple.
- Frank Langstone, former New Zealand MP, Cabinet Minister and diplomat. His father abandoned his family and mother died by age 9 causing him to miss out on schooling.
- Arunachalam Muruganantham, a social entrepreneur. Dropped out of school at 14. Named by Forbes as one of the 100 Most Influential People in the World.
- Matt Dillahunty, an American atheist activist. Did not attend college.
- Sam Sloan, amateur lawyer and college dropout.
- Frank Abagnale, former con artist turned security expert who passed the Louisiana bar exam at age 19 after multiple tries.
- Võ Nguyên Giáp, Vietnamese military commander in two wars: The First Indochina War, and later the Vietnam War. Giáp never had any military experience and was a history teacher at a French-speaking academy. He has been described as a "self-taught general".
- Nguyễn Tri Phương was a Nguyễn dynasty mandarin and military commander, who commanded armies during the French conquest of Vietnam. Specifically, at the Siege of Tourane, the Siege of Saigon, and later the Battle of Hanoi (1873). He was born into a peasant family, and never went to school. However, he managed to make a great career through high self-study and self-reliance.
- Ferdinand Foch was a World War I French military general and later Marshal of France. At a young age, Foch was inspired by the stories of the campaigns of his maternal grandfather, and by the age of six he was reading the descriptions of military battles he found in historical works.
- Victor Wembanyama is a basketball player from the San Antonio Spurs who taught himself English.
- Antoine-Henri Jomini was a Swiss military officer who served during the Napoleonic Wars. Jomini was also a military writer and was self-taught in military strategy.
