= Autodidacticism =

Independent education without the guidance of teachers

Autodidacticism (also autodidactism) or self-education (also self-learning, self-study, and self-teaching) is the practice of education without the guidance of teachers. Autodidacts are self-taught people who learn a subject through self-study. Autodidacticism may involve, complement, or be an alternative to formal education. Formal education itself may have a hidden curriculum that requires self-study for the uninitiated.

Generally, autodidacts choose the subject they will study, their studying material, and the studying rhythm and time. Autodidacts may or may not have formal education, and their study may be either a complement or an alternative to formal education. Many notable contributions have been made by autodidacts.

The self-learning curriculum is infinite. One may seek out alternative pathways in education and use these to gain competency; self-study may meet some prerequisite-curricula criteria for experiential education or apprenticeship.

Self-education techniques can include reading educational books or websites, watching educational videos and listening to educational audio recordings, or by visiting infoshops. One uses some space as a learning space, where one uses critical thinking to develop study skills within the broader learning environment until they have reached an academic comfort zone, characterizes the point at which an independent learner transitions from basic inquiry to a level of familiarity that allows for sophisticated engagement with the subject matter.

== Terminology ==
The term autodidact has its roots in the Ancient Greek words αὐτός (autós, lit. 'self') and διδακτικός (didaktikos, lit. 'teaching'). The related term didacticism defines a philosophy of education.

Various terms are used to describe self-education. One such is heutagogy, coined in 2000 by Stewart Hase and Chris Kenyon of Southern Cross University in Australia; others are self-directed learning and self-determined learning. In the heutagogy paradigm, a learner should be at the centre of their own learning. A truly self-determined learning approach also sees the heutagogic learner exploring different approaches to knowledge to learn; there is an element of experimentation underpinned by a personal curiosity.

Andragogy "strive[s] for autonomy and self-direction in learning", while Heutagogy "identif[ies] the potential to learn from novel experiences as a matter of course [...] manage their own learning". Ubuntugogy is a type of cosmopolitanism that has a collectivist ethics of awareness concerning the African diaspora.

== Modern era ==
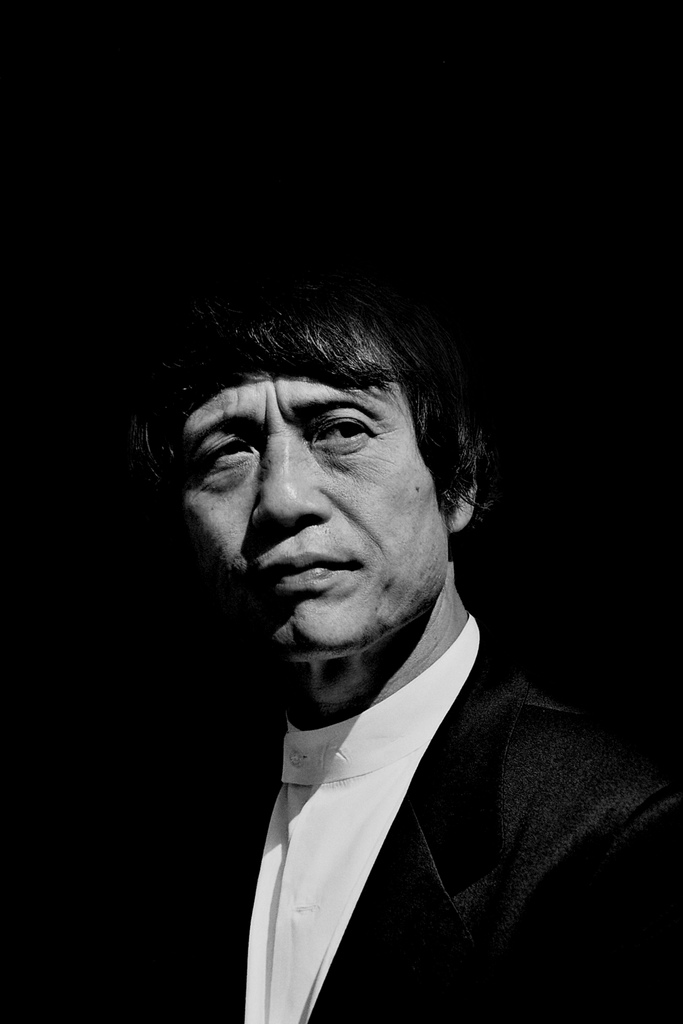
Tadao Ando, a famous architect from Japan born in 1941.

Autodidacticism is sometimes a complement of modern formal education. As a complement to formal education, students would be encouraged to do more independent work.

Before the twentieth century, only a small minority of people received an advanced academic education. As stated by Joseph Whitworth in his influential report on industry and innovators dated from 1853, literacy rates were higher in the United States than in England. However, even in the U.S., most children were not completing high school. High school education was necessary to become a teacher. In modern times, a larger percentage of those completing high school also attended college, usually to pursue a professional degree, such as law or medicine, or a divinity degree.

Collegiate teaching was based on the classics (Latin, philosophy, ancient history, theology) until the early nineteenth century. There were few if any institutions of higher learning offering studies in engineering or science before 1800. Institutions such as the Royal Society did much to promote scientific learning, including public lectures. In England, there were also itinerant lecturers offering their service, typically for a fee.

Prior to the nineteenth century, there were many important inventors working as millwrights or mechanics who, typically, had received an elementary education and served an apprenticeship. Mechanics, instrument makers and surveyors had various mathematics training. James Watt was a surveyor and instrument maker and is described as being "largely self-educated". Watt, like some other autodidacts of the time, became a Fellow of the Royal Society and a member of the Lunar Society. In the eighteenth century these societies often gave public lectures and were instrumental in teaching chemistry and other sciences with industrial applications which were neglected by traditional universities. Academies also arose to provide scientific and technical training.

Years of schooling in the United States began to increase sharply in the early twentieth century. This phenomenon was seemingly related to increasing mechanization displacing child labor. The automated glass bottle-making machine is said to have done more for education than child labor laws because boys were no longer needed to assist. However, the number of boys employed in this particular industry was not that large; it was mechanization in several sectors of industry that displaced child labor toward education. For males in the U.S. born 1886–90, years of school averaged 7.86, while for those born in 1926–30, years of school averaged 11.46.

One of the most recent trends in education is that the classroom environment should cater towards students' individual needs, goals, and interests. This model adopts the idea of inquiry-based learning where students are presented with scenarios to identify their own research, questions and knowledge regarding the area. As a form of discovery learning, students in today's classrooms are being provided with more opportunity to "experience and interact" with knowledge, which has its roots in autodidacticism.

Successful self-teaching can require self-discipline and reflective capability. Some research suggests that the ability to regulate one's own learning may need to be modeled to some students so that they become active learners, while others learn dynamically via a process outside conscious control. To interact with the environment, a framework has been identified to determine the components of any learning system: a reward function, incremental action value functions and action selection methods. Rewards work best in motivating learning when they are specifically chosen on an individual student basis. New knowledge must be incorporated into previously existing information as its value is to be assessed. Ultimately, these scaffolding techniques, as described by Vygotsky (1978) and problem solving methods are a result of dynamic decision making.

In his book Deschooling Society, philosopher Ivan Illich strongly criticized 20th-century educational culture and the institutionalization of knowledge and learning—arguing that institutional schooling as such is an irretrievably flawed model of education—advocating instead ad-hoc co-operative networks through which autodidacts could find others interested in teaching themselves a given skill or about a given topic, supporting one another by pooling resources, materials, and knowledge.

Secular and modern societies have given foundations for new systems of education and new kinds of autodidacts. As Internet access has become more widespread the World Wide Web (explored using search engines such as Google) in general, and websites such as Wikipedia (including parts of it that were included in a book or referenced in a reading list), YouTube, Udemy, Udacity and Khan Academy in particular, have developed as learning centers for many people to actively and freely learn together. Organizations like The Alliance for Self-Directed Education (ASDE) have been formed to publicize and provide guidance for self-directed education. Entrepreneurs like Henry Ford, Steve Jobs, and Bill Gates are considered influential self-teachers.

== History ==
The first philosophical claim supporting an autodidactic program to the study of nature and God was in the philosophical novel Hayy ibn Yaqdhan (Alive son of the Vigilant), whose titular hero is considered the archetypal autodidact. The story is a medieval autodidactic utopia, a philosophical treatise in a literary form, which was written by the Andalusian philosopher Ibn Tufail in the 1160s in Marrakesh. It is a story about a feral boy, an autodidact prodigy who masters nature through instruments and reason, discovers laws of nature by practical exploration and experiments, and gains summum bonum through a mystical mediation and communion with God. The hero rises from his initial state of tabula rasa to a mystical or direct experience of God after passing through the necessary natural experiences. The focal point of the story is that human reason, unaided by society and its conventions or by religion, can achieve scientific knowledge, preparing the way to the mystical or highest form of human knowledge.

Commonly translated as "The Self-Taught Philosopher" or "The Improvement of Human Reason", Ibn-Tufayl's story Hayy Ibn-Yaqzan inspired debates about autodidacticism in a range of historical fields from classical Islamic philosophy through Renaissance humanism and the European Enlightenment. In his book Reading Hayy Ibn-Yaqzan: a Cross-Cultural History of Autodidacticism, Avner Ben-Zaken showed how the text traveled from late medieval Andalusia to early modern Europe and demonstrated the intricate ways in which autodidacticism was contested in and adapted to diverse cultural settings.

Autodidacticism apparently intertwined with struggles over Sufism in twelfth-century Marrakesh; controversies about the role of philosophy in pedagogy in fourteenth-century Barcelona; quarrels concerning astrology in Renaissance Florence in which Pico della Mirandola pleads for autodidacticism against the strong authority of intellectual establishment notions of predestination; and debates pertaining to experimentalism in seventeenth-century Oxford. Pleas for autodidacticism echoed not only within close philosophical discussions; they surfaced in struggles for control between individuals and establishments.

In the story of Black American self-education, Heather Andrea Williams presents a historical account to examine Black American's relationship to literacy during slavery, the Civil War and the first decades of freedom. Many of the personal accounts tell of individuals who have had to teach themselves due to racial discrimination in education.

== Future role ==
The role of self-directed learning continues to be investigated in learning approaches, along with other important goals of education, such as content knowledge, epistemic practices and collaboration. As colleges and universities offer distance learning degree programs and secondary schools provide cyber school options for K–12 students, technology provides numerous resources that enable individuals to have a self-directed learning experience. Several studies show these programs function most effectively when the "teacher" or facilitator is a full owner of virtual space to encourage a broad range of experiences to come together in an online format. This allows self-directed learning to encompass both a chosen path of information inquiry, self-regulation methods and reflective discussion among experts as well as novices in a given area. Furthermore, massive open online courses (MOOCs) make autodidacticism easier and thus more common.

A 2016 Stack Overflow poll reported that due to the rise of autodidacticism, 69.1% of software developers appear to be self-taught.

== See also ==
- Academic conference
- Analytical skill
- Anti-intellectualism
- Body of knowledge
- Critical thinking
- Criticism of schooling
- Course (education)
- Cryptanalysis
- Curriculum studies
- Democratic education
- Democratization of knowledge
- Do it yourself
- Distance education
- Extracurricular activity
- Handbibliothek des allgemeinen und praktischen Wissens
- Hermeneutics of suspicion
- Independent study
- Individualism
- Informal learning
- Intellectual need
- Intelligence
- Learner autonomy
- Learning
- Liberation psychology
- Lifelong learning
- List of self-managed social centers
- Metacognition
- Open-source curriculum
- Pedagogy
- Personal development
- Polymath
- Procedural knowledge
- Reading (process)
- Rhizome (philosophy)
- Scholar
- Self awareness
- Self-experimentation
- Subject (documents)
- Tutorial
- Unschooling
