= Independent study =

Form of educational activity

Independent study is a form of education offered by many high schools, colleges, and other educational institutions. It is sometimes referred to as directed study, and is an educational activity undertaken by an individual with little to no supervision. Typically a student and professor or teacher agree upon a topic for the student to research with guidance from the instructor for an agreed upon amount of credits. Independent studies provide a way for well-motivated students to pursue a topic of interest that does not necessarily fit into a traditional academic curriculum. They are a way for students to learn specialized material or gain research experience.

Independent studies provide students opportunities to explore their interests deeper and make important decisions about how and where they will direct their talents in the future. Another way to understand independent study is to understand learning from a distance. Learning from a distance is a theory in which the student is at a physical or a mental distance from their teacher. The student and the teacher are connected by something such as a worksheet, an essay, or through a website on the internet.

== Programs ==
For elementary and junior high, independent study is sometimes a Gifted and Talented Education (GATE) program, where the student must research the topic and formulate and answer questions. At the end, they develop and present a product, although not all GATE systems participate in this.

Many charter schools in the US provide independent study and homeschooling in a variety of formats: online, in-person or a hybrid of online/in-person interaction. These independent study programs are particularly helpful for those who find a traditional classroom setting to be unsatisfactory. For example, independent study is ideal for those who have children, health issues, intense work schedules, or gifted academic ability. Often students with high scholastic standing are encouraged to take independent studies to try to learn without attendance in a class. Independent study is also useful for self-directed learning activities that allow the student to be self-reliant.

A program titled "The Research Experiences for Undergraduates" (REU) has been founded by the National Science Foundation which provides funding for undergraduates to engage in different areas of research outside of the classroom. Groups are formed of graduates, undergraduates, and faculty to work on a specific research project.

== Personality types ==
Studies have shown that personality can influence whether a person enjoys an independent study project, rather than lectures.

Though not afforded the same attention as personality of the student, some interest should be given to the teachers and or professor's ability to relate to the distance learner. Breaking the mold of in-class instruction versus the distance learner can be a difficult task to undertake by the instructor.

== See also ==
- Autodidacticism
- Citizen science
- List of notable autodidacts
- Independent scholar
- Independent scientist
