= Jiska Cohen-Mansfield =

Swiss-born geriatrics academic

Jiska Cohen-Mansfield (Hebrew: יסקה כהן-מנספילד; born 1951) is the Igor Orenstein Chair for the Study of Geriatrics at Tel Aviv University Medical School and a professor at the Department of Health Promotion at the School of Public Health in the Sackler Medical Faculty at Tel Aviv University. She is the director of the Minerva Center for Interdisciplinary Study of End of Life at Tel-Aviv University.

== Biography ==
Jiska Cohen-Mansfield was born in Switzerland in 1951. She is the daughter of Dr. Tirza Cohen and Dr. Jacob Zeev Cohen and the granddaughter of Abraham Fraenkel. She studied psychology and statistics at the Hebrew University in Jerusalem and earned her master's degree in statistics from Hebrew University as well as another master's degree and a Ph.D. degree in clinical psychology from Stony Brook University. Later she earned an M.B.A. from George Washington University.

In 1987, she was appointed professor at Georgetown University Medical School, Washington DC, where she stayed until 1998 when she moved to George Washington University Medical School, Washington D.C. In 2005, she was appointed professor at Tel Aviv University Medical School.

In 1984, Cohen-Mansfield founded the Research Institute on Aging at the Hebrew Home of Greater Washington, the largest nursing home in Maryland. In 2005, she established the Department of Health Promotion at the School of Public Health at Tel Aviv University, and in 2011, she opened the Minerva Center for Interdisciplinary Study of End of Life at Tel Aviv University.

Since 1985, Cohen-Mansfield's research has been funded by multiple foundations and government agencies such as the National Institute of Mental Health, the National Institute on Aging, the Alzheimer's Association, the Agency for Healthcare Research and Quality, the Israel Science Foundation, and the Minerva Foundation.

Cohen-Mansfield has received multiple professional awards, including the Busse Research Award, the Barry Reisberg Award for Alzheimer's Research, the Pfizer Quality Improvement Award, the Psychologists in Long-Term Care Outstanding Contribution Award, the Powell Lawton Distinguished Contribution Award in Applied Gerontology, the International Psychogeriatric Association 2015 Award for Distinguished Service to the Field of Psychogeriatrics, and fellowships in the Gerontological Society of America and the American Psychological Association.

== Research ==
Cohen-Mansfield's research in the field of clinical gerontology focuses on understanding the experience of persons with dementia, improving the health and care of persons with dementia and other frailties, and promoting physical and mental health in all older adults.

=== Agitation/behavioral symptoms in persons with dementia ===
A pioneer in the study of behavioral symptoms in dementia, Cohen-Mansfield was the first to define agitation in persons with dementia. Using assessments she developed (see assessment section), Cohen-Mansfield was the first to identify the distinctive syndromes of agitation, namely verbal agitation, physically nonaggressive agitation, and aggressive agitation. This categorization has later been substantiated by studies with populations from around the world. Subsequently, Cohen-Mansfield examined the etiology of agitation in persons with dementia. She used the findings concerning etiology to develop the theoretical framework of unmet needs underlying agitated behavior, and to contrast it with alternative theories. The most common unmet needs are needs for meaningful activity, for social contact and for relief from pain and discomfort. This conceptualization became the basis for subsequent studies of non-pharmacological treatment of behavioral symptoms manifested by persons with dementia. For these studies she devised a decision tree algorithm (named Treatment Routes for Exploring Agitation; TREA) in order to assist caregivers in identifying the needs of the person with dementia, and matching the intervention to the unmet need and to the person's unique preferences and abilities. She also investigated the specific non-pharmacological interventions utilized in the algorithm and their efficacy. Cohen-Mansfield's work has challenged the prevailing paradigm that conceptualized agitation as a biologically caused mental illness symptom to be treated by psychoactive medications and physical restraints. As a result, guidelines and consensus statements regarding behavior problems in dementia now emphasize and require at least a trial of non-pharmacological interventions, and clinical management has become more person-centered.

=== Understanding persons with dementia ===
The unmet needs identified in the examination of etiology of agitation prompted several lines of research concerning those unmet needs. Several studies focused on the under-detection of pain experienced by persons with dementia and culminated in a study comparing different assessment instruments for pain and clarifying which type of assessment is optimal for detecting pain that is likely to respond to analgesic medication. Another line of studies concerning unmet needs pertained to the question of whether and how it is possible to engage persons with dementia with stimuli. The first series of papers examined the impact of individual stimuli on engagement within the context of the Comprehensive Process Model for Engagement of Persons with Dementia. Following findings regarding the potency of social stimuli, the focus shifted to group activities as they can provide both social contact and engaging activities. Cohen-Mansfield investigated the feasibility and utility of group activities for persons with dementia using a theoretical model modified for a group setting. Tailoring activities and lifestyle to past and current preferences of people with dementia emerged as a leading principle of care, leading to the investigation of the retained self-identities of persons with dementia and older persons' and caregivers' perceptions of those identities. This focus on individualization of care activities also led to an examination of preferences in self-maintenance activities, such as preferences concerning environmental conditions during sleep. Other lines of research included the impact of physical restraints on persons with dementia that included the first articles published on the methods and impact of removal of physical restraints. Along the same philosophy of care was a study of double blind randomized removal of psychotropic medication for persons with dementia. Another group of studies involved challenging the current paradigms concerning psychotic symptoms in persons with dementia and showing how delusions could most often be explained by the cognitive symptoms of dementia.

=== End of life ===
When advance directives were enacted in the U.S., Cohen-Mansfield examined preferences for life sustain interventions among nursing home residents and hospital patients, and the actual care provided vs. stated preferences for such interventions in the nursing home setting. More recent investigations describe the end of life period in terms of its cost trajectories, quality, and other characteristics.

=== Mental health promotion for older persons ===
Cohen-Mansfield has initiated and directed multiple studies concerned with prevention of decline and promoting well-being in older persons. These included studies on topics such loneliness among older persons, physical activity by frail older persons, a comparison of interventions to help persons who complain of memory problems, retirement planning courses, health behaviors in old age, and use of technology to improve wellbeing. She also co-edited a book on wellbeing among the oldest-old.

=== Health services research ===
As part of her work in nursing homes and other settings for persons with dementia, Cohen-Mansfield examined some of the systems in which care is provided. She studied staff stress in nursing homes and the ensuing turnover and absenteeism, as well as back injuries experienced by staff members. In an effort to examine ways for improving the settings of care, she co-edited a book on satisfaction surveys in long-term care. She also studied specific services for addressing mental health issues of persons with dementia, such as the underutilization of adult day services for persons with dementia, the use of psychiatric consultations within the nursing home, and the characteristics of transitional care units that aim to help caregivers support the persons with dementia who manifest the most challenging symptoms.

Within her studies on mental health promotion of older persons, Cohen-Mansfield examined specific services, including services within Naturally Occurring Retirement Communities (NORCs), intergenerational activities, the use and impact of telephone hotlines for older persons and their caregivers, and the use of migrant in-home caregivers.

=== Methodology ===
Some of Cohen-Mansfield's work concerns exploration of methodological dilemmas or the development of new methodological approaches for addressing complex methodological challenges.

=== Assessments ===
The exploration of new frontiers in aging research in general and in dementia research in particular necessitated the development of assessment instruments to examine these new areas. Therefore, Cohen-Mansfield developed multiple assessment instruments on diverse topics, including agitation in persons with dementia, preferences for life sustaining treatments, quality of life values, observed sleep patterns, medical decision-making, pain in persons with dementia, and others.

Cohen-Mansfield developed two instruments for assessing agitation, an informant-rating assessment, the Cohen-Mansfield Agitation Inventory (CMAI), and a behavior mapping observational assessment, the Agitation Behavior Mapping instrument (ABMI). The most well-known and widely used of her assessments is the CMAI, in which the primary caregiver rates the frequency with which persons with dementia manifest different agitated behaviors. The CMAI has been translated into over 20 languages, and is used for clinical purposes and research worldwide.

== Publications ==
Cohen-Mansfield has published over 350 publications in scientific journals and books. According to an editorial in the Journal of Gerontology, she is one of the 19 most highly cited gerontologists according to ISI.

=== Books ===
1. Cohen-Mansfield, J., Ejaz, F.K. & Werner, P. (Eds.). (2000). Satisfaction Surveys in Long-Term Care. New York: Springer. Reviewed in the Journal of Social Work in Long-Term Care, 1(1) 2002, and in The Gerontologist, 40(6) 2000.
2. Poon, L., W. & Cohen-Mansfield, J.(Eds.) (2011) Understanding Well-Being in the Oldest-Old, Cambridge University Press. Reviewed by Linda George in The Gerontologist Vol. 52, No. 6, 871–880.
3. Abraham A. Fraenkel, Recollections of a Jewish Mathematician in Germany, edited by Jiska Cohen-Mansfield, translated by Allison Brown
