= Journal of Aging & Social Policy =

- Discipline: Gerontology, policy analysis
- Language: English
- Edited by: Edward Alan Miller

Publication details
- History: 1989-present
- Publisher: Routledge
- Frequency: Quarterly
- Impact factor: 1.512 (2017)

Standard abbreviations
- ISO 4: J. Aging Soc. Policy

Indexing
- ISSN: 0895-9420 (print); 1545-0821 (web)
- LCCN: 2003215228
- OCLC no.: 16859137

Links
- Journal homepage; Online access; Online archive

The Journal of Aging & Social Policy is a peer-reviewed medical and social science journal covering aging and related public policy issues. It currently releases 6 issues per year. It was established in 1989 and is published by Routledge. The editor-in-chief is Edward Alan Miller (University of Massachusetts Boston). According to the Journal Citation Reports, the journal has a 2019 impact factor of 1.444.
