= Scripta Mathematica =

- Discipline: Mathematics
- Language: English

Publication details
- Publisher: Yeshiva University

Standard abbreviations
- ISO 4: Scr. Math.

Scripta Mathematica was a quarterly journal published by Yeshiva University devoted to the Philosophy, history, and expository treatment of mathematics. It was said to be, at its time, "the only mathematical magazine in the world edited by specialists for laymen."

The journal was established in 1932 under the editorship of Jekuthiel Ginsburg, a professor of mathematics at Yeshiva University, and its first issue appeared in 1933 at a subscription price of three dollars per year. It ceased publication in 1973. Notable papers published in Scripta Mathematica included work by Nobelist Percy Williams Bridgman concerning the implications for physics of set-theoretic paradoxes, and Hermann Weyl's obituary of Emmy Noether.

Some sources describe Scripta Mathematica as having been assigned ISSN 0036-9713 but it ceased publication prior to the establishment of the ISSN system.
