= Ordinal notation =

Type of mathematical function

In mathematical logic and set theory, an ordinal notation is a partial function mapping the set of all finite sequences of symbols, themselves members of a finite alphabet, to a countable set of ordinals. A Gödel numbering is an injective function mapping the set of well-formed formulae (a finite sequence of symbols on which the ordinal notation function is defined) of some formal language to the natural numbers. This associates each well-formed formula with a unique natural number, called its Gödel number. If a Gödel numbering is fixed, then the subset relation on the ordinals induces an ordering on well-formed formulae, which in turn induces a well-ordering on the subset of natural numbers. A recursive ordinal notation must satisfy the following two additional properties:

1. the subset of natural numbers is a recursive set
2. the induced well-ordering on the subset of natural numbers is a recursive relation

There are many such schemes of ordinal notations, including schemes by Wilhelm Ackermann, Heinz Bachmann, Wilfried Buchholz, Georg Cantor, Solomon Feferman, Gerhard Jäger, Isles, Pfeiffer, Wolfram Pohlers, Kurt Schütte, Gaisi Takeuti (called ordinal diagrams), Oswald Veblen. Stephen Cole Kleene has a system of notations, called Kleene's O, which includes ordinal notations but it is not as well behaved as the other systems described here.

Usually one proceeds by defining several functions from ordinals to ordinals and representing each such function by a symbol. In many systems, such as Veblen's well known system, the functions are normal functions, that is, they are strictly increasing and continuous in at least one of their arguments, and increasing in other arguments. Another desirable property for such functions is that the value of the function is greater than each of its arguments, so that an ordinal is always being described in terms of smaller ordinals. There are several such desirable properties. Unfortunately, no one system can have all of them since they conflict with each other.

== A simplified example using a pairing function ==
As usual, we must start off with a constant symbol for zero, "$0$", which we may consider to be a function of arity zero. This is necessary because there are no smaller ordinals in terms of which zero can be described.

The most obvious next step would be to define a unary function, "S" that takes an ordinal to the smallest ordinal greater than it; in other words, S is the successor function. In combination with zero, successor allows one to name any natural number.

The third function might be defined as one that maps each ordinal to the smallest ordinal that cannot yet be described with the above two functions and previous values of this function. This would map $\beta$ to $\omega\cdot\beta$, except when $\beta$ is a fixed point of that function plus a finite number, in which case one maps $\beta$ to $\omega\cdot(\beta+1)$.

The fourth function would map $\alpha$ to $\omega^\omega\cdot\alpha$, except when $\alpha$ is a fixed point of that function plus a finite number, in which case one maps $\alpha$ to $\omega^\omega\cdot(\alpha+1)$.

=== ξ-notation ===
One could continue in this way, but it would give us an infinite number of functions. So instead, let us merge the unary functions into a binary function. By transfinite recursion on $\alpha$, we can use transfinite recursion on $\beta$ to define $\xi(\alpha,\beta)$ to be the smallest ordinal $\gamma$ such that $\alpha<\gamma$ and $\beta<\gamma$ and $\gamma$ is not the value of $\xi$ for any smaller $\alpha$ or for the same $\alpha$ with a smaller $\beta$.

Thus, define $\xi$-notations as follows:

- "$0$" is a $\xi$-notation for zero.
- If "A" and "B" are replaced by $\xi$-notations for $\alpha$ and $\beta$ in "ξAB", then the result is a $\xi$-notation for $\xi(\alpha,\beta)$.
- There are no other $\xi$-notations.

The function $\xi$ is defined for all pairs of ordinals and is one-to-one. It always gives values larger than its arguments and its range is all ordinals other than 0 and the epsilon numbers.

One has $\xi(\alpha,\beta)<\xi(\gamma,\delta)$ when either

- $\alpha=\gamma$ and $\beta<\delta$, or
- $\alpha<\gamma$ and $\beta<\xi(\gamma,\delta)$, or
- $\alpha>\gamma$ and $\xi(\alpha,\beta)\leq\delta$.

With this definition, the first few ξ-notations are:

"0" for 0. "ξ00" for 1. "ξ0ξ00" for ξ(0,1)=2. "ξξ000" for ξ(1,0)=ω. "ξ0ξ0ξ00" for 3. "ξ0ξξ000" for ω+1. "ξξ00ξ00" for ω·2. "ξξ0ξ000" for ω^{ω}. "ξξξ0000" for $\omega^{\omega^{\omega}}.$

In general, $\xi(0,\beta)=\beta+1$. While ξ(1+α,β) = ω^{ω^{α}}·(β+k) for k = 0 or 1 or 2 depending on special situations:
k = 2 if α is an epsilon number and β is finite.
Otherwise, k = 1 if β is a multiple of ω^{ω^{α+1}} plus a finite number.
Otherwise, k = 0.

That is:

$$\alpha + 1 = \xi (0, \alpha) .$$

$$1 \leq \gamma < \omega^{\omega^{\beta + 1}} \land n < \omega \implies \omega^{\omega^{\beta + 1}} \cdot \alpha + \omega^{\omega^\beta} \cdot (\omega \cdot \gamma + n) = \xi (1 + \beta, \omega^{\omega^{\beta + 1}} \cdot \alpha + (\omega \cdot \gamma + n)) .$$

$$(0 < \alpha \lor \beta < \omega^\beta) \land n < \omega \implies \omega^{\omega^{\beta + 1}} \cdot \alpha + \omega^{\omega^\beta} \cdot (n + 1) = \xi (1 + \beta, \omega^{\omega^{\beta + 1}} \cdot \alpha + n) .$$

$$\beta = \omega^\beta \land n < \omega \implies \omega^{\omega^\beta} \cdot (n + 2) = \xi (\beta, n) .$$

The ξ-notations can be used to name any ordinal less than ε_{0} with an alphabet of only two symbols ("0" and "ξ"). If these notations are extended by adding functions that enumerate epsilon numbers, then they will be able to name any ordinal less than the first epsilon number that cannot be named by the added functions. This last property, adding symbols within an initial segment of the ordinals gives names within that segment, is called repleteness (after Solomon Feferman).

== Examples of Ordinal Notations ==
There are many different systems for ordinal notation introduced by various authors. It is often quite hard to convert between the different systems.

=== Cantor ===
"Exponential polynomials" in 0 and ω gives a system of ordinal notation for ordinals less than ε_{0}. There are many equivalent ways to write these; instead of exponential polynomials, one can use rooted trees, or nested parentheses, or the system described above.

=== Veblen ===
The 2-variable Veblen functions (Veblen 1908) can be used to give a system of ordinal notation for ordinals less than the Feferman–Schütte ordinal. The Veblen functions in a finite or transfinite number of variables give systems of ordinal notations for ordinals less than the small and large Veblen ordinals.

=== Ackermann ===
Ackermann (1951) described a system of ordinal notation rather weaker than the system described earlier by Veblen. The limit of his system is sometimes called the Ackermann ordinal.

=== Bachmann ===
Bachmann (1950) introduced the key idea of using uncountable ordinals to produce new countable ordinals. His original system was rather cumbersome to use as it required choosing a special sequence converging to each ordinal. Later systems of notation introduced by Feferman and others avoided this complication.

=== Takeuti (ordinal diagrams) ===
Takeuti (1987) described a system of ordinal notation known as "ordinal diagrams", whose limit is the Takeuti–Feferman–Buchholz ordinal. The system was later simplified by Feferman.

=== Feferman's θ functions ===
Feferman introduced theta functions, described in Buchholz (1986) as follows. For an ordinal α, θ_{α} is a function mapping ordinals to ordinals. Often θ_{α}(β) is written as θαβ. The set C(α, β) is defined by induction on α to be the set of ordinals that can be generated from 0, ω_{1}, ω_{2}, ..., ω_{ω}, together with the ordinals less than β by the operations of ordinal addition and the functions θ_{ξ} for ξ<α. And the function θ_{γ} is defined to be the function enumerating the ordinals δ with δ∉C(γ,δ). The problem with this system is that ordinal notations and collapsing functions are not identical, and therefore this function does not qualify as an ordinal notation. An associated ordinal notation is not known.

=== Buchholz ===
Buchholz (1986) described the following system of ordinal notation as a simplification of Feferman's theta functions. Define:

- Ω_{ξ} = ω_{ξ} if ξ > 0, Ω_{0} = 1

The functions ψ_{v}(α) for α an ordinal, v an ordinal at most ω, are defined by induction on α as follows:

- ψ_{v}(α) is the smallest ordinal not in C_{v}(α)

where C_{v}(α) is the smallest set such that

- C_{v}(α) contains all ordinals less than Ω_{v}
- C_{v}(α) is closed under ordinal addition
- C_{v}(α) is closed under the functions ψ_{u} (for u≤ω) applied to arguments less than α.

This system has about the same strength as Fefermans system, as $\theta\varepsilon_{\Omega_v+1}0 = \psi_0(\varepsilon_{\Omega_v+1})$ for v ≤ ω. Yet, while this system is powerful, it does not qualify as an ordinal notation. Buchholz did create an associated ordinal notation, yet it is complicated: the definition is in the main article.

=== Kleene's O ===
Kleene (1938) described a system of notation for all recursive ordinals (those less than the Church–Kleene ordinal). Unfortunately, unlike the other systems described above there is in general no effective way to tell whether some natural number represents an ordinal, or whether two numbers represent the same ordinal. However, one can effectively find notations that represent the ordinal sum, product, and power (see ordinal arithmetic) of any two given notations in Kleene's $\mathcal{O}$; and given any notation for an ordinal, there is a recursively enumerable set of notations that contains one element for each smaller ordinal and is effectively ordered. Kleene's $\mathcal{O}$ denotes a canonical (and very non-computable) set of notations. It uses a subset of the natural numbers instead of finite strings of symbols, and is not recursive, therefore, once again, not qualifying as a recursive ordinal notation.

== List of limits of various ordinal notations and collapsing functions ==
Table of limits of various notations and functions
| Notation | Supremum of expressible countable ordinals |
|---|---|
| Cantor normal form | Epsilon-naught $\varepsilon_0$ |
| Binary Veblen function | Feferman–Schütte ordinal $\Gamma_0$ |
| Finitary Veblen function | Small Veblen ordinal |
| Bird's $\theta$ function | Small Veblen ordinal $\theta(\Omega^\omega)$ |
| Extended Veblen function | Large Veblen ordinal |
| Bachmann's $\psi$ function | Bachmann–Howard ordinal $\psi_\Omega(\varepsilon_{\Omega+1})$ |
| Madore's $\psi$ function | Bachmann–Howard ordinal $\psi(\varepsilon_{\Omega+1})$ |
| Weiermann's $\vartheta$ function | Bachmann–Howard ordinal $\vartheta(\varepsilon_{\Omega+1})$ |
| Feferman's $\theta$ function | Takeuti–Feferman–Buchholz ordinal $\theta_{\varepsilon_{\Omega_\omega+1}}(0)$ |
| Buchholz's $\psi$ function | Takeuti–Feferman–Buchholz ordinal $\psi_0(\varepsilon_{\Omega_\omega+1})$ |
| Rathjen's $\psi$ function | $\psi_\Omega(\chi_{\varepsilon_M + 1}(0))$ |
| Rathjen's $\Psi$ function | > $\Psi(\varepsilon_{K+1})$ |
| Stegert's First $\Psi$ function | > $\Psi^{\varepsilon_{\Xi}+1}_{(\omega^+; \mathsf{P}_0; \epsilon; \epsilon; 0)}$ |
| Stegert's Second $\Psi$ function | > Large Stegert ordinal $\Psi^{\varepsilon_Y+1}_{(\omega^+; \mathsf{P}_0; \epsilon; \epsilon; 0)}$ |
| Taranovsky's $C$ function | Existence unknown, but recursive and very large |
| Kleene's $\mathcal{O}$ function | Church-Kleene ordinal $\omega_1^{\mathsf{CK}}$ |
| Klev's $\mathcal{O}^+$ function | Supremum of writable ordinals $\lambda$ |
| Klev's $\mathcal{O}^{++}$ function | Supremum of eventually writable ordinals $\zeta$ |

== See also ==
- Large countable ordinals
- Ordinal arithmetic
- Ordinal analysis
