= Large countable ordinal =

Ordinals in mathematics and set theory

In the mathematical discipline of set theory, there are many ways of describing specific countable ordinals. The smallest ones can be usefully and non-circularly expressed in terms of their Cantor normal forms. Beyond that, many ordinals of relevance to proof theory still have computable ordinal notations (see ordinal analysis). However, it is not possible to decide effectively whether a given putative ordinal notation is a notation or not (for reasons somewhat analogous to the unsolvability of the halting problem); various more-concrete ways of defining ordinals that definitely have notations are available.

Since there are only countably many notations, all ordinals with notations are exhausted well below the first uncountable ordinal ω_{1}; their supremum is called Church–Kleene ω_{1} or ω^{CK}_{1} (not to be confused with the first uncountable ordinal, ω_{1}), described below. Ordinal numbers below ω^{CK}_{1} are the recursive ordinals (see below). Countable ordinals larger than this may still be defined, but do not have notations.

Due to the focus on countable ordinals, ordinal arithmetic is used throughout, except where otherwise noted. The ordinals described here are not as large as the ones described in large cardinals, but they are large among those that have constructive notations (descriptions). Larger and larger ordinals can be defined, but they become more and more difficult to describe.

== Generalities on recursive ordinals ==
=== Ordinal notations ===
Computable ordinals (or recursive ordinals) are certain countable ordinals: loosely speaking those represented by a computable function. There are several equivalent definitions of this: the simplest is to say that a computable ordinal is the order-type of some recursive (i.e., computable) well-ordering of the natural numbers; so, essentially, an ordinal is recursive when we can present the set of smaller ordinals in such a way that a computer (Turing machine, say) can manipulate them (and, essentially, compare them).

A different definition uses Kleene's system of ordinal notations. Briefly, an ordinal notation is either the name zero (describing the ordinal 0), or the successor of an ordinal notation (describing the successor of the ordinal described by that notation), or a Turing machine (computable function) that produces an increasing sequence of ordinal notations (that describe the ordinal that is the limit of the sequence), and ordinal notations are (partially) ordered so as to make the successor of o greater than o and to make the limit greater than any term of the sequence (this order is computable; however, the set O of ordinal notations itself is highly non-recursive, owing to the impossibility of deciding whether a given Turing machine does indeed produce a sequence of notations); a recursive ordinal is then an ordinal described by some ordinal notation.

Any ordinal smaller than a recursive ordinal is itself recursive, so the set of all recursive ordinals forms a certain (countable) ordinal, the Church–Kleene ordinal (see below).

It is tempting to forget about ordinal notations, and only speak of the recursive ordinals themselves: and some statements are made about recursive ordinals which, in fact, concern the notations for these ordinals. This leads to difficulties, however, as even the smallest infinite ordinal, ω, has many notations, some of which cannot be proved to be equivalent to the obvious notation (the simplest program that enumerates all natural numbers).

=== Relationship to systems of arithmetic ===
There is a relation between computable ordinals and certain formal systems (containing arithmetic, that is, at least a reasonable fragment of Peano arithmetic).

Certain computable ordinals are so large that while they can be given by a certain ordinal notation o, a given formal system might not be sufficiently powerful to show that o is, indeed, an ordinal notation: the system does not show transfinite induction for such large ordinals.

For example, the usual first-order Peano axioms do not prove transfinite induction for (or beyond) ε_{0}: while the ordinal ε_{0} can easily be arithmetically described (it is countable), the Peano axioms are not strong enough to show that it is indeed an ordinal; in fact, transfinite induction on ε_{0} proves the consistency of Peano's axioms (a theorem by Gentzen), so by Gödel's second incompleteness theorem, Peano's axioms cannot formalize that reasoning. (This is at the basis of the Kirby–Paris theorem on Goodstein sequences.) Since Peano arithmetic can prove that any ordinal less than ε_{0} is well ordered, we say that ε_{0} measures the proof-theoretic strength of Peano's axioms.

But we can do this for systems far beyond Peano's axioms. For example, the proof-theoretic strength of Kripke–Platek set theory is the Bachmann–Howard ordinal, and, in fact, merely adding to Peano's axioms the axioms that state the well-ordering of all ordinals below the Bachmann–Howard ordinal is sufficient to obtain all arithmetical consequences of Kripke–Platek set theory.

== Specific recursive ordinals ==
=== Predicative definitions and the Veblen hierarchy ===
We have already mentioned (see Cantor normal form) the ordinal ε_{0}, which is the smallest satisfying the equation $\omega^\alpha = \alpha$, so it is the limit of the sequence 0, 1, $\omega$, $\omega^\omega$, $\omega^{\omega^\omega}$, ... The next ordinal satisfying this equation is called ε_{1}: it is the limit of the sequence

$$\varepsilon_0+1, \qquad \omega^{\varepsilon_0+1}=\varepsilon_0\cdot\omega,\qquad\omega^{\omega^{\varepsilon_0+1}}=(\varepsilon_0)^\omega,\qquad\text{etc.}$$

More generally, the $\iota$-th ordinal such that $\omega^\alpha = \alpha$ is called $\varepsilon_\iota$. We could define $\zeta_0$ as the smallest ordinal such that $\varepsilon_\alpha=\alpha$, but since the Greek alphabet does not have transfinitely many letters it is better to use a more robust notation: define ordinals $\varphi_\gamma(\beta)$ by transfinite induction as follows: let $\varphi_0(\beta) = \omega^\beta$ and let $\varphi_{\gamma+1}(\beta)$ be the $\beta$-th fixed point of $\varphi_\gamma$ (i.e., the $\beta$-th ordinal such that $\varphi_\gamma(\alpha)=\alpha$; so for example, $\varphi_1(\beta) = \varepsilon_\beta$), and when $\delta$ is a limit ordinal, define $\varphi_\delta(\alpha)$ as the $\alpha$-th common fixed point of the $\varphi_\gamma$ for all $\gamma<\delta$. This family of functions is known as the Veblen hierarchy (there are inessential variations in the definition, such as letting, for $\delta$ a limit ordinal, $\varphi_\delta(\alpha)$ be the limit of the $\varphi_\gamma(\alpha)$ for $\gamma<\delta$: this essentially just shifts the indices by 1, which is harmless). $\varphi_\gamma$ is called the $\gamma^{th}$ Veblen function (to the base $\omega$).

Ordering: $\varphi_\alpha(\beta) < \varphi_\gamma(\delta)$ if and only if either ($\alpha = \gamma$ and $\beta < \delta$) or ($\alpha < \gamma$ and $\beta < \varphi_\gamma(\delta)$) or ($\alpha > \gamma$ and $\varphi_\alpha(\beta) < \delta$).

=== The Feferman–Schütte ordinal and beyond ===
The smallest ordinal such that $\varphi_\alpha(0) = \alpha$ is known as the Feferman–Schütte ordinal and generally written $\Gamma_0$. It can be described as the set of all ordinals that can be written as finite expressions, starting from zero, using only the Veblen hierarchy and addition. The Feferman–Schütte ordinal is important because, in a sense that is complicated to make precise, it is the smallest (infinite) ordinal that cannot be ("predicatively") described using smaller ordinals. It measures the strength of such systems as "arithmetical transfinite recursion".

More generally, Γ_{α} enumerates the ordinals that cannot be obtained from smaller ordinals using addition and the Veblen functions.

It is, of course, possible to describe ordinals beyond the Feferman–Schütte ordinal. One could continue to seek fixed points in a more and more complicated manner: enumerate the fixed points of $\alpha\mapsto\Gamma_\alpha$, then enumerate the fixed points of that, and so on, and then look for the first ordinal α such that α is obtained in α steps of this process, and continue diagonalizing in this ad hoc manner. This leads to the definition of the "small" and "large" Veblen ordinals.

=== Impredicative ordinals ===
To go far beyond the Feferman–Schütte ordinal, one needs to introduce new methods. Unfortunately there is not yet any standard way to do this: every author in the subject seems to have invented their own system of notation, and it is quite hard to translate between the different systems. The first such system was introduced by Bachmann in 1950 (in an ad hoc manner), and different extensions and variations of it were described by Buchholz, Takeuti (ordinal diagrams), Feferman (θ systems), Aczel, Bridge, Schütte, and Pohlers. However most systems use the same basic idea, of constructing new countable ordinals by using the existence of certain uncountable ordinals. Here is an example of such a definition, described in much greater detail in the article on ordinal collapsing function:

- ψ(α) is defined to be the smallest ordinal that cannot be constructed by starting with 0, 1, ω and Ω, and repeatedly applying addition, multiplication and exponentiation, and ψ to previously constructed ordinals (except that ψ can only be applied to arguments less than α, to ensure that it is well defined).

Here Ω = ω_{1} is the first uncountable ordinal. It is put in because otherwise the function ψ gets "stuck" at the smallest ordinal σ such that ε_{σ}=σ: in particular ψ(α)=σ for any ordinal α satisfying σ≤α≤Ω. However the fact that we included Ω allows us to get past this point: ψ(Ω+1) is greater than σ. The key property of Ω that we used is that it is greater than any ordinal produced by ψ.

To construct still larger ordinals, we can extend the definition of ψ by throwing in more ways of constructing uncountable ordinals. There are several ways to do this, described to some extent in the article on ordinal collapsing function.

The Bachmann–Howard ordinal (sometimes just called the Howard ordinal, ψ_{0}(ε_{Ω+1}) with the notation above) is an important one, because it describes the proof-theoretic strength of Kripke–Platek set theory. Indeed, the main importance of these large ordinals, and the reason to describe them, is their relation to certain formal systems as explained above. However, such powerful formal systems as full second-order arithmetic, let alone Zermelo–Fraenkel set theory, seem beyond reach for the moment.

=== Beyond even the Bachmann-Howard ordinal ===
Beyond this, there are multiple recursive ordinals which aren't as well known as the previous ones. The first of these is Buchholz's ordinal, defined as $\psi_0(\Omega_\omega)$, abbreviated as just $\psi(\Omega_\omega)$, using the previous notation. It is the proof-theoretic ordinal of $\Pi_1^1-CA_0$, a first-order theory of arithmetic allowing quantification over the natural numbers as well as sets of natural numbers, and $ID_{<\omega}$, the "formal theory of finitely iterated inductive definitions".

Since the hydras from Buchholz's hydra game are isomorphic to Buchholz's ordinal notation, the ordinals up to this point can be expressed using hydras from the game.^{p.136} For example $+(0(\omega))$ corresponds to $\psi(\Omega_\omega)$.

Next is the Takeuti-Feferman-Buchholz ordinal, the proof-theoretic ordinal of $\Pi_1^1 -CA + BI$; and another subsystem of second-order arithmetic: $\Pi_1^1$ - comprehension + transfinite induction, and $ID_\omega$, the "formal theory of $\omega$-times iterated inductive definitions". In this notation, it is defined as $\psi_0(\varepsilon_{\Omega_\omega + 1})$. It is the supremum of the range of Buchholz's psi functions. It was first named by David Madore.

The next ordinal is mentioned in a piece of code describing large countable ordinals and numbers in Agda, and defined by "AndrasKovacs" as $\psi_0(\Omega_{\omega+1} \cdot \varepsilon_0)$.

The next ordinal is mentioned in the same piece of code as earlier, and defined as $\psi_0(\Omega_{\omega^\omega})$. It is the proof-theoretic ordinal of $ID_{<\omega^\omega}$.

This next ordinal is, once again, mentioned in this same piece of code, defined as $\psi_0(\Omega_{\varepsilon_0})$, is the proof-theoretic ordinal of $ID_{<\varepsilon_0}$. In general, the proof-theoretic ordinal of $ID_{<\nu}$ is equal to $\psi_0(\Omega_{\nu})$ — note that in this certain instance, $\Omega_0$ represents $1$, the first nonzero ordinal.

Next is an unnamed ordinal, referred by David Madore as the "countable" collapse of $\varepsilon_{I+1}$, where $I$ is the first inaccessible (=$\Pi^1_0$-indescribable) cardinal. This is the proof-theoretic ordinal of Kripke-Platek set theory augmented by the recursive inaccessibility of the class of ordinals (KPi), or, on the arithmetical side, of $\Delta^1_2$ -comprehension + transfinite induction. Its value is equal to $\psi(\varepsilon_{I+1})$ using an unknown function.

Next is another unnamed ordinal, referred by David Madore as the "countable" collapse of $\varepsilon_{M+1}$, where $M$ is the first Mahlo cardinal. This is the proof-theoretic ordinal of KPM, an extension of Kripke-Platek set theory based on a Mahlo cardinal. Its value is equal to $\psi(\varepsilon_{M+1})$ using one of Buchholz's various psi functions.

Next is another unnamed ordinal, referred by David Madore as the "countable" collapse of $\varepsilon_{K+1}$, where $K$ is the first weakly compact (=$\Pi^1_1$-indescribable) cardinal. This is the proof-theoretic ordinal of Kripke-Platek set theory + Π3 - Ref. Its value is equal to $\Psi(\varepsilon_{K+1})$ using Rathjen's Psi function.

Next is another unnamed ordinal, referred by David Madore as the "countable" collapse of $\varepsilon_{\Xi+1}$, where $\Xi$ is the first $\Pi^2_0$-indescribable cardinal. This is the proof-theoretic ordinal of Kripke-Platek set theory + Πω-Ref. Its value is equal to $\Psi^{\varepsilon_{\Xi+1}}_X$ using Stegert's Psi function, where $X$ = ($\omega^+$; $P_0$; $\epsilon$, $\epsilon$, 0).

Next is the last unnamed ordinal, referred by David Madore as the proof-theoretic ordinal of Stability. This is the proof-theoretic ordinal of Stability, an extension of Kripke-Platek set theory. Its value is equal to $\Psi^{\varepsilon_{\Upsilon+1}}_X$ using Stegert's Psi function, where $X$ = ($\omega^+$; $P_0$; $\epsilon$, $\epsilon$, 0).

Next is a group of ordinals about which not that much is known, but which are still fairly significant (in ascending order):

- The proof-theoretic ordinal of second-order arithmetic.
- A possible limit of Taranovsky's C ordinal notation. (Conjectural, assuming well-foundedness of the notation system)
- The proof-theoretic ordinal of ZFC.

=== "Unrecursable" recursive ordinals ===
By dropping the requirement of having a concrete description, even larger recursive countable ordinals can be obtained as the ordinals measuring the strengths of various strong theories; roughly speaking, these ordinals are the smallest order types of "natural" ordinal notations that the theories cannot prove are well ordered. By taking stronger and stronger theories such as second-order arithmetic, Zermelo set theory, Zermelo–Fraenkel set theory, or Zermelo–Fraenkel set theory with various large cardinal axioms, one gets some extremely large recursive ordinals. (Strictly speaking it is not known that all of these really are ordinals: by construction, the ordinal strength of a theory can only be proved to be an ordinal from an even stronger theory. So for the large cardinal axioms this becomes quite unclear.)

== Beyond recursive ordinals ==
=== The Church–Kleene ordinal ===
The supremum of the set of recursive ordinals is the smallest ordinal that cannot be described in a recursive way. (It is not the order type of any recursive well-ordering of the integers.) That ordinal is a countable ordinal called the Church–Kleene ordinal, $\omega_1^{\mathrm{CK}}$. Thus, $\omega_1^{\mathrm{CK}}$ is the smallest non-recursive ordinal, and there is no hope of precisely "describing" any ordinals from this point on—we can only define them. But it is still far less than the first uncountable ordinal, $\omega_1$. However, as its symbol suggests, it behaves in many ways rather like $\omega_1$. For instance, one can define ordinal collapsing functions using $\omega_1^{\mathrm{CK}}$ instead of $\omega_1$.

=== Admissible ordinals ===
The Church–Kleene ordinal is again related to Kripke–Platek set theory, but now in a different way: whereas the Bachmann–Howard ordinal (described above) was the smallest ordinal for which KP does not prove transfinite induction, the Church–Kleene ordinal is the smallest α such that the construction of the Gödel universe, L, up to stage α, yields a model $L_\alpha$ of KP. Such ordinals are called admissible, thus $\omega_1^{\mathrm{CK}}$ is the smallest admissible ordinal (beyond ω in case the axiom of infinity is not included in KP).

By a theorem of Friedman, Jensen, and Sacks, the countable admissible ordinals are exactly those constructed in a manner similar to the Church–Kleene ordinal but for Turing machines with oracles. One sometimes writes $\omega_\alpha^{\mathrm{CK}}$ for the $\alpha$-th ordinal that is either admissible or a limit of smaller admissibles.

=== Beyond admissible ordinals ===
$\omega_\omega^{\mathrm{CK}}$ is the smallest limit of admissible ordinals (mentioned later), yet the ordinal itself is not admissible. It is also the smallest $\alpha$ such that $L_\alpha \cap P(\omega)$ is a model of $\Pi^1_1$-comprehension.

An ordinal that is both admissible and a limit of admissibles, or equivalently such that $\alpha$ is the $\alpha$-th admissible ordinal, is called recursively inaccessible, and the least recursively inaccessible may be denoted $\omega_1^{E_1}$. An ordinal that is both recursively inaccessible and a limit of recursively inaccessibles is called recursively hyperinaccessible. There exists a theory of large ordinals in this manner that is highly parallel to that of (small) large cardinals. For example, we can define recursively Mahlo ordinals: these are the $\alpha$ such that every $\alpha$-recursive closed unbounded subset of $\alpha$ contains an admissible ordinal (a recursive analog of the definition of a Mahlo cardinal). The 1-section of Harrington's functional ${}^2S^\#$ is equal to $L_\rho\cap\mathcal P(\omega)$, where $\rho$ is the least recursively Mahlo ordinal.^{p.171}

But note that we are still talking about possibly countable ordinals here. (While the existence of inaccessible or Mahlo cardinals cannot be proved in Zermelo–Fraenkel set theory, that of recursively inaccessible or recursively Mahlo ordinals is a theorem of ZFC: in fact, any regular cardinal is recursively Mahlo and more, but even if we limit ourselves to countable ordinals, ZFC proves the existence of recursively Mahlo ordinals. They are, however, beyond the reach of Kripke–Platek set theory.)

=== Reflection ===
For a set of formulae $\Gamma$, a limit ordinal $\alpha$ is called $\Gamma$-reflecting if the rank $L_\alpha$ satisfies a certain reflection property for each $\Gamma$-formula $\phi$. These ordinals appear in ordinal analysis of theories such as KP+Π_{3}-ref, a theory augmenting Kripke-Platek set theory by a $\Pi_3$-reflection schema. They can also be considered "recursive analogues" of some uncountable cardinals such as weakly compact cardinals and indescribable cardinals. For example, an ordinal which $\Pi_3$-reflecting is called recursively weakly compact. For finite $n$, the least $\Pi_n$-reflecting ordinal is also the supremum of the closure ordinals of monotonic inductive definitions whose graphs are Π_{m+1}^{0}.

In particular, $\Pi_3$-reflecting ordinals also have a characterization using higher-type functionals on ordinal functions, lending them the name 2-admissible ordinals. An unpublished paper by Solomon Feferman supplies, for each finite $n$, a similar property corresponding to $\Pi_n$-reflection.

=== Nonprojectibility ===
An admissible ordinal $\alpha$ is called nonprojectible if there is no total $\alpha$-recursive injective function mapping $\alpha$ into a smaller ordinal. (This is trivially true for regular cardinals; however, we are mainly interested in countable ordinals.) Being nonprojectible is a much stronger condition than being admissible, recursively inaccessible, or even recursively Mahlo. By Jensen's method of projecta, this statement is equivalent to the statement that the Gödel universe, L, up to stage α, yields a model $L_\alpha$ of KP + $\Sigma_1$-separation. However, $\Sigma_1$-separation on its own (not in the presence of $V=L$) is not a strong enough axiom schema to imply nonprojectibility, in fact there are transitive models of $KP$+$\Sigma_1$-separation of any countable admissible height $>\omega$.

Nonprojectible ordinals are tied to Jensen's work on projecta. The least ordinals that are nonprojectible relative to a given set are tied to Harrington's construction of the smallest reflecting Spector 2-class.^{p.174}

=== "Unprovable" ordinals ===
We can imagine even larger ordinals that are still countable. For example, if ZFC has a transitive model (a hypothesis stronger than the mere hypothesis of consistency, and implied by the existence of an inaccessible cardinal), then there exists a countable $\alpha$ such that $L_\alpha$ is a model of ZFC. Such ordinals are beyond the strength of ZFC in the sense that it cannot (by construction) prove their existence.

If $T$ is a recursively enumerable set theory consistent with V=L, then the least $\alpha$ such that $(L_\alpha,\in)\vDash T$ is less than the least stable ordinal, which follows.

=== Stable ordinals ===
Even larger countable ordinals, called the stable ordinals, can be defined by indescribability conditions or as those $\alpha$ such that $L_\alpha$ is a Σ_{1}-elementary submodel of L; the existence of these ordinals can be proved in ZFC, and they are closely related to the nonprojectible ordinals from a model-theoretic perspective. For countable $\alpha$, stability of $\alpha$ is equivalent to $L_\alpha\prec_{\Sigma_1}L_{\omega_1}$.

The least stable level of $L$ has some definability-related properties. Letting $\sigma$ be least such that $L_\sigma\prec_1 L$:

- A set has a $\Sigma_1$ definition in $L$ if and only if it is a member of $L_\sigma$.^{p.6}
- A set $x\subseteq\mathbb N$ is $\Delta^1_2$ if and only if it is a member of $L_\sigma$.^{p.6}
- A set $x\subseteq\mathbb N$ is $\Sigma^1_2$ if and only if it is $\sigma$-recursively enumerable, in the terminology of alpha recursion theory.^{p.6}

==== Variants of stable ordinals ====
These are weakened variants of stable ordinals. There are ordinals with these properties smaller than the aforementioned least nonprojectible ordinal, for example an ordinal is $(+1)$-stable if it is $\Pi_n^0$-reflecting for all natural $n$.

- A countable ordinal $\alpha$ is called $(+\beta)$-stable if $L_\alpha \prec_{\Sigma_1} L_{\alpha+\beta}$
- A countable ordinal $\alpha$ is called $(^+)$-stable if $L_\alpha \prec_{\Sigma_1} L_{\beta}$, where $\beta$ is the least admissible ordinal larger than $\alpha$.
- A countable ordinal $\alpha$ is called $(^{++})$-stable if $L_\alpha \prec_{\Sigma_1} L_{\beta}$, where $\beta$ is the least admissible ordinal larger than an admissible ordinal larger than $\alpha$.
- A countable ordinal $\alpha$ is called inaccessibly-stable if $L_\alpha \prec_{\Sigma_1} L_{\beta}$, where $\beta$ is the least recursively inaccessible ordinal larger than $\alpha$.
- A countable ordinal $\alpha$ is called Mahlo-stable if $L_\alpha \prec_{\Sigma_1} L_{\beta}$, where $\beta$ is the least recursively Mahlo ordinal larger than $\alpha$.
- A countable ordinal $\alpha$ is called doubly $(+1)$-stable if there is a $(+1)$-stable ordinal $\beta > \alpha$ such that $L_\alpha \prec_{\Sigma_1} L_{\beta}$.

Stronger weakenings of stability have appeared in proof-theoretic publications, including analysis of subsystems of second-order arithmetic.

== A pseudo-well-ordering ==
Within the scheme of notations of Kleene some represent ordinals and some do not. One can define a recursive total ordering that is a subset of the Kleene notations and has an initial segment which is well-ordered with order-type $\omega_1^{\mathrm{CK}}$. Every recursively enumerable (or even hyperarithmetic) nonempty subset of this total ordering has a least element. So it resembles a well-ordering in some respects. For example, one can define the arithmetic operations on it. Yet it is not possible to effectively determine exactly where the initial well-ordered part ends and the part lacking a least element begins.

For an example of a recursive pseudo-well-ordering, let S be ATR_{0} or another recursively axiomatizable theory that has an ω-model but no hyperarithmetical ω-models, and (if needed) conservatively extend S with Skolem functions. Let T be the tree of (essentially) finite partial ω-models of S: A sequence of natural numbers $x_1,x_2,...,x_n$ is in T if S plus ∃m φ(m) ⇒ φ(x_{⌈φ⌉}) (for the first n formulas φ with one numeric free variable; ⌈φ⌉ is the Gödel number) has no inconsistency proof shorter than n. Then the Kleene–Brouwer order of T is a recursive pseudowellordering.

Any such construction must have order type $\omega_1^{CK}\times (1+\eta)+\rho$, where $\eta$ is the order type of $(\mathbb Q,<)$, and $\rho$ is a recursive ordinal.
