= Large Veblen ordinal =

Certain large countable ordinal

In set theory, the large Veblen ordinal is a specific large countable ordinal number, named after Oswald Veblen.

There is no standard notation for ordinals beyond the Feferman–Schütte ordinal $\Gamma_0$. Most systems of notation use symbols such as $\psi(\alpha)$, $\theta(\alpha)$, or $\psi_\alpha(\beta)$, some of which are modifications of the Veblen functions to produce countable ordinals even for uncountable arguments, and some of which are ordinal collapsing functions.

The large Veblen ordinal (LVO) is

$$\sup \{ \varphi (\Omega^\omega), \varphi (\Omega^{\varphi (\Omega^\omega)}), \varphi (\Omega^{\varphi (\Omega^{\varphi (\Omega^\omega)})}), \ldots \}$$.

It is sometimes denoted by $\theta(\Omega^\Omega)$ or $\psi(\Omega^{\Omega^\Omega})$. It was constructed by Veblen using an extension of Veblen functions allowing infinitely many arguments.

LVO is the least ordinal which is not the sum of a finite number of values of the transfinite Veblen function, $\varphi$, when applied to functions of finite support from LVO to itself. Those functions are encoded as ordinals less than $\operatorname{LVO}^{\operatorname{LVO}}$ (ordinal exponentiation) and $\Omega$ is used as a place holder for LVO. Notice that $\operatorname{LVO} = \operatorname{SVO}^\operatorname{LVO}$ is much larger than the small Veblen ordinal SVO.
