= Ackermann ordinal =

Certain large countable ordinal

In set theory, the Ackermann ordinal is a certain large countable ordinal, named after Wilhelm Ackermann. The term "Ackermann ordinal" is also occasionally used for the small Veblen ordinal, a somewhat larger ordinal.

There is no standard notation for ordinals beyond the Feferman–Schütte ordinal $\Gamma_0$. Most systems of notation use symbols such as $\psi(\alpha)$, $\theta(\alpha)$, or $\psi_\alpha(\beta)$, some of which are modifications of the Veblen functions to produce countable ordinals even for uncountable arguments, and some of which are ordinal collapsing functions. The last one is an extension of the Veblen functions for more than two arguments.

The smaller Ackermann ordinal is the limit of a system of ordinal notations invented by Ackermann, and is sometimes denoted by $\theta(\Omega^2)$, $\psi(\Omega^{\Omega^2})$, or $\varphi(1,0,0,0)$, where $\Omega$ is the smallest uncountable ordinal. Ackermann's system of notation is weaker than the system introduced much earlier by Veblen, which he seems to have been unaware of.
