= Computable ordinal =

Countable ordinal that is the order type of a computable well-ordering of natural numbers

In mathematics, specifically computability and set theory, a computable (or recursive) ordinal is an ordinal number that can be represented as a computable well-ordering of natural numbers.

== Definition ==
An ordinal $\alpha$ is computable if there exists a computable well-ordering $\prec$ of a computable subset $S$ of the natural numbers having the order type $\alpha$. This means that given any $x \in \mathbb{N}$ it is decidable whether $x \in S$, and given any $x, y \in S$ it is decidable whether $x \prec y$. Alternatively, this condition can be characterized with a single Turing machine that decides whether $x \in S \and y \in S \and x \preceq y$ for any $x, y \in \mathbb{N}$.

Another equivalent definition states that $\alpha$ is computable if it either is finite or is the order type of a computable well-ordering of all natural numbers. This equivalence holds because, if $S$ is infinite and computable, then one can compute a bijection $f:\mathbb{N}\to S$ by letting $f(n)$ be the $n$th element of $S$ in the usual ordering of the natural numbers; the search always halts because $S$ is infinite. If $\langle S,\prec\rangle$ is a computable well-ordering with order type $\alpha$, then defining $x \prec_f y$ iff $f(x) \prec f(y)$ gives a computable well-ordering $\langle \mathbb{N},\prec_f\rangle$ with the same order type.

== Examples ==
All computable ordinals are by definition countable. Conversely, for many countable ordinals, the "natural" witnesses for countability are also witnesses for computability. For example, the natural ordering $<$ of all natural numbers has order type $\omega$. Since there exists a Turing machine that decides $x < y$, this means that $\omega$ is a computable ordinal.

As another example, the following is the "canonical" construction of a well-ordering $\prec$ of all natural numbers with order type $\omega + \omega$:
$$\begin{matrix}
0 & 2 & 4 & 6 & 8 & \dots & 1 & 3 & 5 & 7 & 9 & \dots
\end{matrix}$$
An algorithm that decides $x \prec y$ can be as follows: Return true if $x$ is even and $y$ is odd, false if $x$ is odd and $y$ is even, and otherwise return $x < y$. Therefore $\omega + \omega$ is also computable. In fact, with similar constructions, it can be shown that the successor of a computable ordinal and the sum, product, and power of a pair of computable ordinals are all computable.

The set of all computable ordinals is closed downwards, i.e., if $\alpha$ is computable and $\beta < \alpha$, then $\beta$ is computable too. This is because any well-ordering $\langle S, \prec \rangle$ with order type $\alpha$ has an initial segment $\langle S', \prec \rangle$ with order type $\beta$, where $S' = \{ x \in S \mid x \prec x_\beta\}$ (for some fixed $x_\beta \in S$) is a computable subset of $S$ if $\prec$ is computable.

== Church–Kleene ordinal ==
The supremum of all computable ordinals is called the Church–Kleene ordinal, the first nonrecursive ordinal, and denoted by $\omega_1^{\mathsf{CK}}$. The Church–Kleene ordinal is a limit ordinal. An ordinal is computable if and only if it is smaller than $\omega_1^{\mathsf{CK}}$. Since there are only countably many computable binary relations, there are also only countably many computable ordinals. Thus, $\omega_1^{\mathsf{CK}}$ is countable.

The computable ordinals are exactly the ordinals that have an ordinal notation in Kleene's $\mathcal{O}$.

== See also ==
- Arithmetical hierarchy
- Large countable ordinal
- Ordinal analysis
- Ordinal notation
