= William Reinhardt =

William Reinhar(d)t may refer to:

== Real people ==
- William Reinhardt (mathematician), see Ackermann set theory
- Bill Reinhart (1896–1971), American college sports coach

== Fictional characters ==
- William Reinhardt, character in Hell House (novel)
- William Reinhardt (The Passage)
