= Wilhelm Ackermann =

German mathematician (1896–1962)

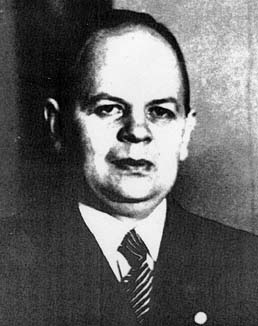
- Ackermann in c. 1935
- Born: 29 March 1896; Herscheid, German Empire
- Died: 24 December 1962 (aged 66); Lüdenscheid, West Germany
- Education: University of Göttingen
- Known for: Ackermann coding Ackermann function Ackermann ordinal Ackermann set theory
- Scientific career
- Fields: Mathematics
- Doctoral advisor: David Hilbert

Wilhelm Friedrich Ackermann (/ˈækərmən/; German: [ˈakɐˌman]; 29 March 1896 – 24 December 1962) was a German mathematician and logician best known for his work in mathematical logic and the Ackermann function, an important example in the theory of computation.

== Biography ==
Ackermann was born in Herscheid, Germany, and was awarded a Ph.D. by the University of Göttingen in 1925 for his thesis Begründung des "tertium non datur" mittels der Hilbertschen Theorie der Widerspruchsfreiheit, which was a consistency proof of arithmetic apparently without Peano induction (although it did use e.g. induction over the length of proofs). This was one of two major works in proof theory in the 1920s and the only one following Hilbert's school of thought. From 1929 until 1948, he taught at the Arnoldinum Gymnasium in Burgsteinfurt, and then at Lüdenscheid until 1961. He was also a corresponding member of the Akademie der Wissenschaften (Academy of Sciences) in Göttingen, and was an honorary professor at the University of Münster.

In 1928, Ackermann helped David Hilbert turn his 1917 – 22 lectures on introductory mathematical logic into a text, Principles of Mathematical Logic. This text contained the first exposition ever of first-order logic, and posed the problem of its completeness and decidability (Entscheidungsproblem). Ackermann went on to construct consistency proofs for set theory (1937), full arithmetic (1940), type-free logic (1952), and a new axiomatization of set theory (1956).

Later in life, Ackermann continued working as a high school teacher. He kept engaged in the field of research and published many contributions to the foundations of mathematics until the end of his life. He died in Lüdenscheid, West Germany in December 1962.

== See also ==
- Ackermann's bijection
- Ackermann coding
- Ackermann function
- Ackermann ordinal
- Ackermann set theory
- Hilbert–Ackermann system
- Entscheidungsproblem
- Ordinal notation
- Inverse Ackermann function

== Bibliography ==
- 1928. "On Hilbert's construction of the real numbers" in Jean van Heijenoort, ed., 1967. From Frege to Gödel: A Source Book in Mathematical Logic, 1879–1931. Harvard Univ. Press: 493–507.
- 1940. "Zur Widerspruchsfreiheit der Zahlentheorie", Mathematische Annalen, vol. 117, pp 162–194.
- 1950 (1928). (with David Hilbert) Principles of Mathematical Logic. Chelsea. Translation of 1938 German edition.
- 1954. Solvable cases of the decision problem. North Holland.
