= Principles of Mathematical Logic =

Book by Wilhelm Ackermann

- Author: David Hilbert and Wilhelm Ackermann
- Original title: Grundzüge der theoretischen Logik
- Publication date: 1938
- ISBN: 978-3-662-41928-1

Principles of Mathematical Logic is the 1950 American translation of the 1938 second edition of David Hilbert's and Wilhelm Ackermann's classic text Grundzüge der theoretischen Logik, on elementary mathematical logic. The 1928 first edition thereof is considered the first elementary text clearly grounded in the formalism now known as first-order logic (FOL). Hilbert and Ackermann also formalized FOL in a way that subsequently achieved canonical status. FOL is now a core formalism of mathematical logic, and is presupposed by contemporary treatments of Peano arithmetic and nearly all treatments of axiomatic set theory.

The 1928 edition included a clear statement of the Entscheidungsproblem (decision problem) for FOL, and also asked whether that logic was complete (i.e., whether all semantic truths of FOL were theorems derivable from the FOL axioms and rules). The former problem was answered in the negative first by Alonzo Church and independently by Alan Turing in 1936. The latter was answered affirmatively by Kurt Gödel in 1929.

In its description of set theory, mention is made of Russell's paradox and the Liar paradox (page 145). Contemporary notation for logic owes more to this text than it does to the notation of Principia Mathematica, long popular in the English speaking world.
