= Small Veblen ordinal =

Certain large countable ordinal

In mathematics, the small Veblen ordinal is a certain large countable ordinal, named after Oswald Veblen. It is occasionally called the Ackermann ordinal, though the Ackermann ordinal described by Ackermann (1951) is somewhat smaller than the small Veblen ordinal.

There is no standard notation for ordinals beyond the Feferman–Schütte ordinal $\Gamma_0$. Most systems of notation use symbols such as $\psi(\alpha)$, $\theta(\alpha)$, $\psi_\alpha(\beta)$, some of which are modifications of the Veblen functions to produce countable ordinals even for uncountable arguments, and some of which are "collapsing functions".

The small Veblen ordinal $\theta_{\Omega^\omega}(0)$ or $\psi(\Omega^{\Omega^\omega})$ is the limit of ordinals that can be described using a version of Veblen functions with finitely many arguments. It is the ordinal that measures the strength of Kruskal's theorem. It is also the ordinal type of a certain ordering of rooted trees (Jervell 2005).

The small Veblen ordinal (SVO) is $\sup \{ \omega=\varphi (1), \, \varepsilon_0=\varphi (1,0), \, \Gamma_0=\varphi (1,0,0), \, \varphi (1,0,0,0), \, \varphi (1,0,0,0,0), \, \varphi (1,0,0,0,0,0), \ldots \}$ using the finitary Veblen function. SVO is the least ordinal which is not the sum of a finite number of values of the finitary Veblen function when applied to functions of finite support from ω to SVO. These functions can be encoded as ordinals less than $\operatorname{SVO}^{\omega}$ (ordinal exponentiation) and $\Omega$ can be used as a place holder for SVO. Notice that $\operatorname{SVO} = \omega^\operatorname{SVO} = \epsilon_\operatorname{SVO} = \Gamma_\operatorname{SVO}$.
