= Continuous function (ordinal theory) =

Order-continuous function on ordinals

In set theory, a continuous function is a sequence of ordinals such that the values assumed at limit stages are the limits (limit suprema and limit infima) of all values at previous stages. More formally, let γ be an ordinal, and $s := \langle s_{\alpha}| \alpha < \gamma\rangle$ be a γ-sequence of ordinals. Then s is continuous if at every limit ordinal β < γ,

$$s_{\beta} = \limsup\{s_{\alpha}: \alpha < \beta\} = \inf \{ \sup\{s_{\alpha}: \delta \leq \alpha < \beta\} : \delta < \beta\}$$

and

$$s_{\beta} = \liminf\{s_{\alpha}: \alpha < \beta\} = \sup \{ \inf\{s_{\alpha}: \delta \leq \alpha < \beta\} : \delta < \beta\} \,.$$

Alternatively, if s is an increasing function then s is continuous if s: γ → range(s) is a continuous function when the sets are each equipped with the order topology. These continuous functions are often used in cofinalities and cardinal numbers.

A normal function is a function that is both continuous and strictly increasing.
