= Kurt Schütte =

German mathematician

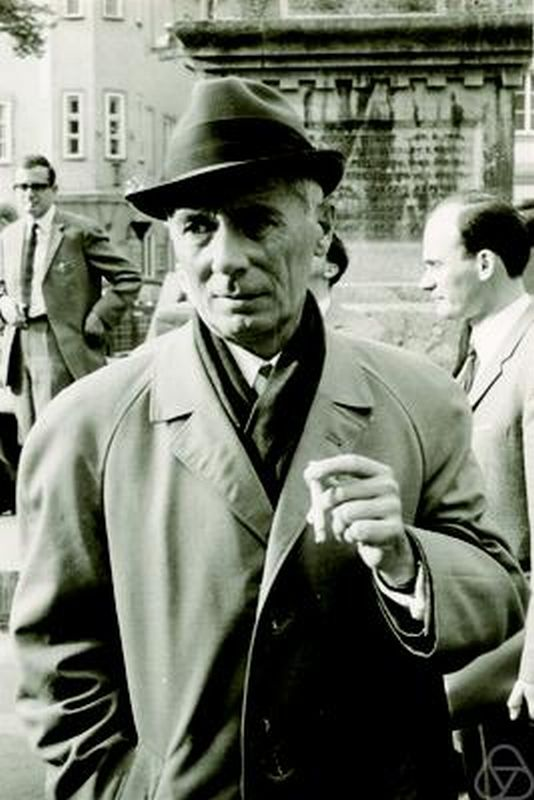
- (Oberwolfach Photo Collection)
- Born: 14 October 1909; Salzwedel
- Died: 18 August 1998 (aged 88); Munich
- Known for: Feferman–Schütte ordinal
- Scientific career
- Thesis: Untersuchungen zum Entscheidungsproblem der mathematischen Logik (1934)
- Doctoral advisor: David Hilbert

Kurt Schütte (14 October 1909 – 18 August 1998) was a German mathematician who worked on proof theory and ordinal analysis. The Feferman–Schütte ordinal, which he showed to be the precise ordinal bound for predicativity, is named after him. He was the doctoral advisor of 16 students, including Wolfgang Bibel, Wolfgang Maaß, Wolfram Pohlers, and Martin Wirsing. He made important contributions to the proof theory of systems with the ω-rule, and made progress towards solving Takeuti's conjecture.

== Biography ==
Kurt Wilhelm Schütte was born on 14 October 1909 in Salzwedel, Germany as the son of August Schütte and Martha Schütte (née Schröder). From 1916 to 1919, he attended the preschool of the Francisceum gymnasium in Zerbst, and from 1920 to 1928 attended the König Wilhelms-Gymnasium in Magdeburg. Schütte studied math, physics, chemistry, and philosophy at the University of Göttingen, and got a doctorate degree in math with David Hilbert as his advisor, being Hilbert's last doctoral student. he worked as a meteorologist for the Reichswetterdienst (Reich Weather Service) from 1937 until the end of World War II. In 1937 he married Hanna Lechte, with whom he had two daughters: Sigrid (born 1939) and Gisela (born 1942).

Later in life, Schütte became blind and used a tape recording device to write mathematical work. He died of a heart attack in 1998.

== Publications ==
- Schütte, Kurt (1977), Proof theory, Grundlehren der Mathematischen Wissenschaften, vol. 225, Berlin-New York: Springer-Verlag, pp. xii+299, ISBN 3-540-07911-4, MR 0505313
  - Beweistheorie, Springer, Grundlehren der mathematischen Wissenschaften, 1960; new edition trans. into English as Proof Theory, Springer-Verlag 1977
- Vollständige Systeme modaler und intuitionistischer Logik, Springer 1968
- with Wilfried Buchholz: Proof Theory of Impredicative Subsystems of Analysis, Bibliopolis, Naples 1988
- with Helmut Schwichtenberg: Mathematische Logik, in Fischer, Hirzebruch et al. (eds.) Ein Jahrhundert Mathematik 1890-1990, Vieweg 1990
