= Veblen function =

Mathematical function on ordinals

In mathematics, the Veblen functions are a hierarchy of normal functions (continuous strictly increasing functions from ordinals to ordinals), introduced by Oswald Veblen in Veblen (1908). If φ_{0} is any normal function, then for any non-zero ordinal α, φ_{α} is the function enumerating the common fixed points of φ_{β} for β<α. These functions are all normal.

== Veblen hierarchy ==
In the special case when φ_{0}(α)=ω^{α} this family of functions is known as the Veblen hierarchy. The function φ_{1} is the same as the ε function: φ_{1}(α)= ε_{α}. If $\alpha < \beta \,,$ then $\varphi_{\alpha}(\varphi_{\beta}(\gamma)) = \varphi_{\beta}(\gamma)$. From this and the fact that φ_{β} is strictly increasing we get the ordering: $\varphi_\alpha(\beta) < \varphi_\gamma(\delta)$ if and only if either ($\alpha = \gamma$ and $\beta < \delta$) or ($\alpha < \gamma$ and $\beta < \varphi_\gamma(\delta)$) or ($\alpha > \gamma$ and $\varphi_\alpha(\beta) < \delta$).

=== Fundamental sequences for the Veblen hierarchy ===
The fundamental sequence for an ordinal with cofinality ω is a distinguished strictly increasing ω-sequence that has the ordinal as its limit. If one has fundamental sequences for α and all smaller limit ordinals, then one can create an explicit constructive bijection between ω and α, (i.e. one not using the axiom of choice). Here we will describe fundamental sequences for the Veblen hierarchy of ordinals. The image of n under the fundamental sequence for α will be indicated by α[n].

A variation of Cantor normal form used in connection with the Veblen hierarchy is: every nonzero ordinal number α can be uniquely written as $\alpha = \varphi_{\beta_1}(\gamma_1) + \varphi_{\beta_2}(\gamma_2) + \cdots + \varphi_{\beta_k}(\gamma_k)$, where k > 0 is a natural number and each term after the first is less than or equal to the previous term, $\varphi_{\beta_m}(\gamma_m) \geq \varphi_{\beta_{m+1}}(\gamma_{m+1}) \,,$ and each $\gamma_m < \varphi_{\beta_m}(\gamma_m).$ If a fundamental sequence can be provided for the last term, then that term can be replaced by such a sequence to get $\alpha [n] = \varphi_{\beta_1}(\gamma_1) + \cdots + \varphi_{\beta_{k-1}}(\gamma_{k-1}) + (\varphi_{\beta_k}(\gamma_k) [n]) \,.$

For any β, if γ is a limit with $\gamma < \varphi_{\beta} (\gamma) \,,$ then let $\varphi_{\beta}(\gamma) [n] = \varphi_{\beta}(\gamma [n]) \,.$

No such sequence can be provided for $\varphi_0(0)$ = ω^{0} = 1 because it does not have cofinality ω.

For $\varphi_0(\gamma+1) = \omega ^{\gamma+1} = \omega^ \gamma \cdot \omega \,,$ we choose $\varphi_0(\gamma+1) [n] = \varphi_0(\gamma) \cdot n = \omega^{\gamma} \cdot n \,.$

For $\varphi_{\beta+1}(0) \,,$ we use $\varphi_{\beta+1}(0) [0] = 0$ and $\varphi_{\beta+1}(0) [n+1] = \varphi_{\beta}(\varphi_{\beta+1}(0) [n]) \,,$ i.e. 0, $\varphi_{\beta}(0)$, $\varphi_{\beta}(\varphi_{\beta}(0))$, etc..

For $\varphi_{\beta+1}(\gamma+1)$, we use $\varphi_{\beta+1}(\gamma+1) [0] = \varphi_{\beta+1}(\gamma)+1$ and $\varphi_{\beta+1}(\gamma+1) [n+1] = \varphi_{\beta} (\varphi_{\beta+1}(\gamma+1) [n]) \,.$

Now suppose that β is a limit:

If $\beta < \varphi_{\beta}(0)$, then let $\varphi_{\beta}(0) [n] = \varphi_{\beta [n]}(0) \,.$

For $\varphi_{\beta}(\gamma+1)$, use $\varphi_{\beta}(\gamma+1) [n] = \varphi_{\beta [n]}(\varphi_{\beta}(\gamma)+1) \,.$

Otherwise, the ordinal cannot be described in terms of smaller ordinals using $\varphi$ and this scheme does not apply to it.

=== The Γ function ===
The function Γ enumerates the ordinals α such that φ_{α}(0) = α. Γ_{0} is the Feferman–Schütte ordinal, i.e. it is the smallest α such that φ_{α}(0) = α.

For Γ_{0}, a fundamental sequence could be chosen to be $\Gamma_0 [0] = 0$ and $\Gamma_0 [n+1] = \varphi_{\Gamma_0 [n]} (0) \,.$

For Γ_{β+1}, let $\Gamma_{\beta+1} [0] = \Gamma_{\beta} + 1$ and $\Gamma_{\beta+1} [n+1] = \varphi_{\Gamma_{\beta+1} [n]} (0) \,.$

For Γ_{β} where $\beta < \Gamma_{\beta}$ is a limit, let $\Gamma_{\beta} [n] = \Gamma_{\beta [n]} \,.$

== Generalizations ==
=== Finitely many variables ===
To build the Veblen function of a finite number of arguments (finitary Veblen function), let the binary function $\varphi(\alpha, \gamma)$ be $\varphi_\alpha(\gamma)$ as defined above.

Let $z$ be an empty string or a string consisting of one or more comma-separated zeros $0,0,...,0$ and $s$ be an empty string or a string consisting of one or more comma-separated ordinals $\alpha _{1},\alpha _{2},...,\alpha _{n}$ with $\alpha _{1}>0$. The binary function $\varphi (\beta ,\gamma )$ can be written as $\varphi (s,\beta ,z,\gamma )$ where both $s$ and $z$ are empty strings. The finitary Veblen functions are defined as follows:

- $\varphi (\gamma )=\omega ^{\gamma }$
- $\varphi (z,s,\gamma )=\varphi (s,\gamma )$
- if $\beta >0$, then $\varphi (s,\beta ,z,\gamma )$ denotes the $(1+\gamma )$-th common fixed point of the functions $\xi \mapsto \varphi (s,\delta ,\xi ,z)$ for each $\delta <\beta$

For example, $\varphi(1,0,\gamma)$ is the $(1+\gamma)$-th fixed point of the functions $\xi\mapsto\varphi(\xi,0)$, namely $\Gamma_\gamma$; then $\varphi(1,1,\gamma)$ enumerates the fixed points of that function, i.e., of the $\xi\mapsto\Gamma_\xi$ function; and $\varphi(2,0,\gamma)$ enumerates the fixed points of all the $\xi\mapsto\varphi(1,\xi,0)$. Each instance of the generalized Veblen functions is continuous in the last nonzero variable (i.e., if one variable is made to vary and all later variables are kept constantly equal to zero).

The limit of the $\varphi(1,0,...,0)$ where the number of zeroes ranges over ω, is sometimes known as the "small" Veblen ordinal.

Every non-zero ordinal $\alpha$ less than the small Veblen ordinal (SVO) can be uniquely written in normal form for the finitary Veblen function:

$\alpha =\varphi (s_{1})+\varphi (s_{2})+\cdots +\varphi (s_{k})$

where

- $k$ is a positive integer
- $\varphi (s_{1})\geq \varphi (s_{2})\geq \cdots \geq \varphi (s_{k})$
- $s_{m}$ is a string consisting of one or more comma-separated ordinals $\alpha _{m,1},\alpha _{m,2},...,\alpha _{m,n_{m}}$ where $\alpha _{m,1}>0$ and each $\alpha _{m,i}<\varphi (s_{m})$

=== Fundamental sequences for limit ordinals of finitary Veblen function ===
For limit ordinals $\alpha<SVO$, written in normal form for the finitary Veblen function:

- $(\varphi(s_1)+\varphi(s_2)+\cdots+\varphi(s_k))[n]=\varphi(s_1)+\varphi(s_2)+\cdots+\varphi(s_k)[n]$,
- $\varphi(\gamma)[n]=\left\{\begin{array}{lcr} n \quad \text{if} \quad \gamma=1\\ \varphi(\gamma-1)\cdot n \quad \text{if} \quad \gamma \quad \text{is a successor ordinal}\\ \varphi(\gamma[n]) \quad \text{if} \quad \gamma \quad \text{is a limit ordinal}\\ \end{array}\right.$,
- $\varphi(s,\beta,z,\gamma)[0]=0$ and $\varphi(s,\beta,z,\gamma)[n+1]=\varphi(s,\beta-1,\varphi(s,\beta,z,\gamma)[n],z)$ if $\gamma=0$ and $\beta$ is a successor ordinal,
- $\varphi(s,\beta,z,\gamma)[0]=\varphi(s,\beta,z,\gamma-1)+1$ and $\varphi(s,\beta,z,\gamma)[n+1]=\varphi(s,\beta-1,\varphi(s,\beta,z,\gamma)[n],z)$ if $\gamma$ and $\beta$ are successor ordinals,
- $\varphi(s,\beta,z,\gamma)[n]=\varphi(s,\beta,z,\gamma[n])$ if $\gamma$ is a limit ordinal,
- $\varphi(s,\beta,z,\gamma)[n]=\varphi(s,\beta[n],z,\gamma)$ if $\gamma=0$ and $\beta$ is a limit ordinal,
- $\varphi(s,\beta,z,\gamma)[n]=\varphi(s,\beta[n],\varphi(s,\beta,z,\gamma-1)+1,z)$ if $\gamma$ is a successor ordinal and $\beta$ is a limit ordinal.

=== Transfinitely many variables ===
More generally, Veblen showed that φ can be defined even for a transfinite sequence of ordinals α_{β}, provided that all but a finite number of them are zero. Notice that if such a sequence of ordinals is chosen from those less than an uncountable regular cardinal κ, then the sequence may be encoded as a single ordinal less than κ^{κ} (ordinal exponentiation). So one is defining a function φ from κ^{κ} into κ.

The definition can be given as follows: let α be a transfinite sequence of ordinals (i.e., an ordinal function with finite support) that ends in zero (i.e., such that α_{0}=0), and let α[γ@0] denote the same function where the final 0 has been replaced by γ. Then γ↦φ(α[γ@0]) is defined as the function enumerating the common fixed points of all functions ξ↦φ(β) where β ranges over all sequences that are obtained by decreasing the smallest-indexed nonzero value of α and replacing some smaller-indexed value with the indeterminate ξ (i.e., β=α[ζ@ι_{0},ξ@ι] meaning that for the smallest index ι_{0} such that α_{ι_{0}} is nonzero the latter has been replaced by some value ζ<α_{ι_{0}} and that for some smaller index ι<ι_{0}, the value α_{ι}=0 has been replaced with ξ).

For example, if α=(1@ω) denotes the transfinite sequence with value 1 at ω and 0 everywhere else, then φ(1@ω) is the smallest fixed point of all the functions ξ↦φ(ξ,0,...,0) with finitely many final zeroes (it is also the limit of the φ(1,0,...,0) with finitely many zeroes, the small Veblen ordinal).

The smallest ordinal α such that α is greater than φ applied to any function with support in α (i.e., that cannot be reached "from below" using the Veblen function of transfinitely many variables) is sometimes known as the "large" Veblen ordinal, or "great" Veblen number.

==== Simplified ====
Here is a simplified version of the transfinitary Veblen function:

We modify this to use functions (of finite support) from the class of all ordinals to itself as input. Such functions can be encoded by a set (rather than a proper class) as follows:

- the set is a finite (possibly empty) set of ordered pairs of ordinals;
- no ordinal appears more than once as the first member of such an ordered pair, i.e. the encoded function is single-valued;
- the ordinal in the second position in an ordered pair is never zero, i.e. a value of zero is indicated by the absence of an ordered pair;
- when using the set as a function, the input ordinal is compared to the first members of the ordered pairs, if it matches one, then the second member is returned as the value; otherwise the value is zero.

Using s and t for such sets and α, β, γ, and δ for ordinals, the definitions are:

$$s < t \iff s (\alpha) < t (\alpha) \text{ where } \alpha = \max \{ 0, \beta : s (\beta) \neq t (\beta) \}$$;
$$D_\phi (s) = \max \{ 0, \alpha, \beta : \langle \alpha, \beta \rangle \in s \}$$;
$\phi (s) = \inf\, \{ \gamma : D_\phi (s) \leq \gamma \land 0 < \gamma \land \forall \delta < \gamma ( \delta + \delta < \gamma ) \land \forall t < s ( D_\phi (t) < \gamma \implies \phi (t) < \gamma ) \}$. Notice that γ is a power of ω.

Notations in this system begin with the zero-ary function 0, and use the binary function addition + to combine powers of ω which come from applying the transfinite Veblen function φ to these set-coded functions.

$$1 = \omega^0 = \phi ( \{ \} )$$;
$$2 = 1 + 1$$;
$$\omega = \omega^1 = \phi ( \{ \langle 0, 1 \rangle \} )$$;
$$\omega^2 = \phi ( \{ \langle 0, 2 \rangle \} )$$;
$\epsilon_0 = \phi ( \{ \langle 1, 1 \rangle \} ) = \phi ( \{ \langle 0, \epsilon_0 \rangle \} )$ a fixed point;
$$\epsilon_1 = \phi ( \{ \langle 1, 1 \rangle , \langle 0, 1 \rangle \} )$$;
$$\Gamma_0 = \phi ( \{ \langle 2, 1 \rangle \} )$$;
$$\Gamma_1 = \phi ( \{ \langle 2, 1 \rangle , \langle 0, 1 \rangle \} )$$;
$SVO = \phi ( \{ \langle \omega, 1 \rangle \} ) = \phi ( \{ \langle 0, SVO \rangle \} )$ Small Veblen Ordinal is an epsilon number;
$$SVO \cdot 2 = SVO + SVO$$;
$$SVO^2 = \phi ( \{ \langle 0, SVO \cdot 2 \rangle \} )$$.

et cetera.

How many times can φ take on some value? The values are always powers of ω.

$$\omega^0 = 1 = \phi ( \{ \} ) ; 0 < \alpha \implies \omega^\alpha = \phi ( \{ \langle 0, \alpha \rangle \} )$$.

So powers of ω are always values of φ at least once. Epsilon numbers are fixed points of that, so they are always values at least twice. Some ordinals are values of φ infinitely often. For example, Ω is a value an uncountable number of times.

$$D_\phi (s) < \phi (s) \land s < t \implies \phi (t) \neq \phi (s)$$.

So if D_{φ} < φ, then that is the last time that φ can take that value. So D_{φ} = φ is the norm for ordinals which are values more than once. D_{φ} > φ never occurs. But

$$\not \exists s ( D_\phi (s) < \Omega = \phi (s) )$$

and there are many other ordinals for which that is true. They are all very strong limits.

The preferred form of s to produce a value of φ (s) is the one for which D_{φ} (s) < φ (s). The ordering theorem is:

$$D_\phi (s) < \phi (s) \land D_\phi (t) < \phi (t) \implies ( \phi (t) < \phi (s) \iff ( t < s \land D_\phi (t) < \phi (s) ) \lor ( s < t \land \phi (t) \leq D_\phi (s) ) )$$;
$$t < s \implies ((D_\phi (t) < \phi (s) \implies \phi (t) < \phi (s))\land(D_\phi (t) = \phi (s) \implies \phi (t) = \phi (s))\land(D_\phi (t) > \phi (s) \implies \phi (t) > \phi (s)))$$;
$$0 < \phi (s)$$;
$$\alpha + \beta < \phi (s) \iff \alpha < \phi (s) \land \beta < \phi (s)$$.

If α is an ordinal with no preferred form, then:

$$D_\phi (s) < \alpha \implies \phi (s) < \alpha$$;
$$\phi ( \{ \langle \alpha, 1 \rangle \} ) = \alpha$$;
$$\{ \langle \alpha, 1 \rangle \} < s \implies \alpha < \phi (s)$$;
$$D_\phi (s) < \alpha \land \gamma < \min \{ \alpha, \beta : \langle \beta, \delta \rangle \in s \} \implies \phi ( s \cup \{ \langle \gamma, \alpha \rangle \} ) = \alpha$$;
$$t \neq \{\} \land \max \{ 0, \beta : \langle \beta, \delta \rangle \in t \} < \gamma < \min \{ \gamma + 1, \beta : \langle \beta, \delta \rangle \in s \} \implies \alpha < \phi ( s \cup \{ \langle \gamma, \alpha \rangle \} \cup t )$$;

The ordering among epsilon numbers which do not have a preferred form depends on how those epsilon numbers are specified. To give us a way to talk about them, let np_{α} be an enumeration of the epsilon numbers lacking a preferred form. Let us also define the complexity, X, of ordinals less than np_{ω} as follows:

$$X (0) = 0$$
$$\beta < \phi (s) \cdot \omega \land D_\phi (s) < \phi (s) \implies X ( \phi (s) + \beta ) = X ( \beta ) + \Sigma \{ X (\mu) + X (\nu) : \langle \mu, \nu \rangle \in s \} + 1$$
$$n < \omega \land \beta < np_n \cdot \omega \implies X ( np_n + \beta ) = X ( \beta ) + n + 2 .$$

The complexity is a (finite) natural number whenever it is defined. And for any natural number k there are only finitely many ordinals α for which X (α) takes the value k or less.

===== Fundamental sequences of the transfinitary Veblen function =====
The fundamental sequence of 0 is the empty sequence. The fundamental sequence of a successor ordinal is (α+1) [0] = α. For ordinals with cofinality ≥ ω written in normal form with length k > 1 and k < ω, the fundamental sequence is:

$$(\varphi(s_1)+\varphi(s_2)+\cdots+\varphi(s_k)) \, [\alpha]=\varphi(s_1)+\varphi(s_2)+\cdots+ (\varphi(s_k) \,[\alpha]) .$$

If φ (s) has a preferred form and is less than np_{ω}, that is it must be strictly greater than D_{φ} (s) :

$$\exist t < s \, ( D_\phi (t) < D_\phi (s) \land D_\phi (s) \leq \phi (t) ) \lor D_\phi (s) = 0 \lor \exist \delta < D_\phi (s) \, ( D_\phi (s) \leq \delta + \delta ) ,$$

then we can define the fundamental sequence of φ (s) by (φ (s)) [n] = ρ_{n} where:

$$\rho_0 = D_\phi (s)$$
$\rho_{n+1} = \sup \{ \mu : \exist t < s ( \mu = \phi (t) \land D_\phi (t) \leq \rho_n \land X (\phi (t)) \leq n ) \lor \mu = 1 \lor \mu = \rho_n + \rho_n \}$ and
$$\rho_\omega = \sup \{ \rho_n : n < \omega \} .$$

We will show that φ (s) = ρ_{ω}. First notice that this sequence is strictly increasing because

$$( \rho_n = 0 < 1 \leq \rho_{n+1} ) \lor ( 0 < \rho_n = \rho_n + 0 < \rho_n + \rho_n \leq \rho_{n+1} ) .$$

Thus

$$D_\phi (s) = \rho_0 < \rho_\omega .$$
$$\delta < \rho_\omega \implies \exist n < \omega ( \delta < \rho_n )$$
$$\delta < \rho_\omega \implies \exist n < \omega ( \delta + \delta < \rho_{n+1} )$$
$$\delta < \rho_\omega \implies \delta + \delta < \rho_\omega$$
$$t < s \land D_\phi (t) < \rho_\omega \implies \exist n < \omega ( t < s \land D_\phi (t) < \rho_n \land X (\phi (t)) \leq n )$$
$$t < s \land D_\phi (t) < \rho_\omega \implies \exist n < \omega ( \phi (t) \leq \rho_{n+1} )$$
$$t < s \land D_\phi (t) < \rho_\omega \implies \phi (t) < \rho_\omega$$
$$\phi (s) \leq \rho_\omega .$$

On the other hand,

$$\rho_0 = D_\phi (s) \leq \phi (s)$$

but φ (s) ≠ 0, 1, or 2, since it has cofinality ≥ ω and φ (s) ≠ D_{φ} (s) since it has a preferred form. Thus

$$\rho_0 < \phi (s) .$$

Now, let us use mathematical induction with the inductive hypothesis ρ_{n} < φ (s) : suppose

$\rho_n < \phi (s) ,$ then
$\rho_n + \rho_n < \phi (s)$ because φ (s) is a power of ω
$$1 < \phi (s)$$
$$t < s \land D_\phi (t) \leq \rho_n < \phi (s) \land \rho_{n+1} = \phi (t) \implies \rho_{n+1} < \phi (s)$$

thus

$$n < \omega \implies \rho_n < \phi (s)$$
$$\rho_\omega \leq \phi (s) .$$

Otherwise, φ (s) lacks a preferred form and we can set:

$$\rho_\alpha = \sup \{ \mu : \mu = 0 \lor \exist \beta < \alpha \exist t < s ( \mu = \rho_\beta + \phi (t) \land ( D_\phi (t) \leq \rho_\beta < \phi (s) ) ) \}$$

via transfinite recursion. This sequence may be longer than ω, but that is unavoidable since the Veblen functions are unable to comprehend some of the more complex ways of forming cofinal sequences. That is, such ordinals include (and may be indistinguishable from) uncountable regular ordinals which do not have fundamental sequences of length ω.

=== Further extensions ===
In Massmann & Kwon (2023), the Veblen function was extended further to a somewhat technical system known as dimensional Veblen. In this, one may take fixed points or row numbers, meaning expressions such as φ(1@(1,0)) are valid (representing the large Veblen ordinal), visualised as multi-dimensional arrays. It was proven that all ordinals below the Bachmann–Howard ordinal could be represented in this system, and that the representations for all ordinals below the large Veblen ordinal were aesthetically the same as in the original system.

== Values ==
The function takes on several prominent values:

- $\varphi(1,0) = \varepsilon_0$ is the proof-theoretic ordinal of Peano arithmetic and the limit of what ordinals can be represented in terms of Cantor normal form and smaller ordinals.
- $\varphi(\omega,0)$, a bound on the order types of the recursive path orderings with finitely many function symbols, and the smallest ordinal closed under primitive recursive ordinal functions.
- The Feferman–Schütte ordinal $\Gamma_0$ is equal to $\varphi(1,0,0)$.
- The small Veblen ordinal is equal to
  $$\varphi\begin{pmatrix}1 \\ \omega\end{pmatrix}$$.
