= Feferman–Schütte ordinal =

Large countable ordinal

In mathematics, the Feferman–Schütte ordinal (Γ_{0}) is a large countable ordinal. It is the proof-theoretic ordinal of several mathematical theories, such as arithmetical transfinite recursion. It is named after Solomon Feferman and Kurt Schütte, the former of whom suggested the name Γ_{0}.

There is no standard notation for ordinals beyond the Feferman–Schütte ordinal. There are several ways of representing the Feferman–Schütte ordinal, some of which use ordinal collapsing functions: $\psi(\Omega^\Omega)$, $\theta(\Omega)$, or $\varphi(1,0,0)$.

== Definition ==
The Feferman–Schütte ordinal can be defined as the smallest ordinal that cannot be obtained by starting with 0 and using the operations of ordinal addition and the binary Veblen functions φ_{α}(β) = φ(α,β). That is, it is the smallest α such that φ_{α}(0) = α.

$$\Gamma_0 = \sup \{ 0, \, 1=\varphi (0,0), \, \varepsilon_0=\varphi (\varphi (0,0), 0), \, \varphi (\varphi (\varphi (0,0), 0), 0), \, \varphi (\varphi (\varphi (\varphi (0,0), 0), 0), 0), \ldots \}$$.

== Properties ==
This ordinal is sometimes said to be the first impredicative ordinal, though this is controversial, partly because there is no generally accepted precise definition of "predicative". Sometimes an ordinal is said to be predicative if it is less than Γ_{0}.

Any recursive path ordering whose function symbols are well-founded with order type less than that of Γ_{0} itself has order type less than Γ_{0}.
