= Buchholz =

Buchholz may refer to:

== Places ==
=== Germany ===
- Buchholz in der Nordheide, a town in the district of Harburg, Lower Saxony
- Französisch Buchholz, a community in Berlin
- Märkisch Buchholz, in the Dahme-Spreewald district, Brandenburg
- Buchholz, Schaumburg, in the district of Schaumburg, Lower Saxony
- Buchholz, Soltau-Fallingbostel, in the district Soltau-Fallingbostel, Lower Saxony
- Buchholz, Mecklenburg-Vorpommern, in the Müritz district, Mecklenburg-Vorpommern
- Gremersdorf-Buchholz in the Nordvorpommern district, Mecklenburg-Vorpommern
- Buchholz, Neuwied, in the district of Neuwied, Rhineland-Palatinate
- Annaberg-Buchholz, a town in Saxony
- Buchholz, Saxony-Anhalt, a village in the district of Stendal, Saxony-Anhalt
- Buchholz, Dithmarschen in the district of Dithmarschen, Schleswig-Holstein
- Buchholz, Lauenburg in the district of Lauenburg, Schleswig-Holstein
- Buchholz, Thuringia, in the district of Nordhausen, Thuringia
- Galerie Buchholz, a chain of art galleries in Cologne and Berlin
- Wittenberge–Buchholz railway
- Buchholz Manor
- Schloss Buchholz

=== Belgium ===
- Buchholz, a village in the municipality of Büllingen

=== United States ===
- Buchholz High School, a high school in Gainesville, Florida

=== Marshall Islands ===
- Bucholz Army Airfield, a US Army airfield in the Marshall Islands

=== Poland ===
- Buchholz, former German name of Bukowiec, Bartoszyce County
- Buchholz, former German name of Bukowo
- Buchholz, former German name of Grabno, Lubusz Voivodeship
- Buchholz, former German name of Grabowo, Stargard County

=== Switzerland ===
- Schlössli Buchholz, a castle in Berneck, St. Gallen

== Other ==
- Buchholz (surname)
- Buchholz hydra, a mathematical game on a labeled tree
- Buchholz psi functions, a system of ordinal collapsing functions
- Buchholz's ID hierarchy, a hierarchy of inductively defined mathematical systems
- Buchholz relay, a safety device for oil-filled electrical transformers
- Buchholz system, a chess ranking system

== See also ==
- Buckholt
