= Ordinal analysis =

Mathematical technique used in proof theory

In proof theory, ordinal analysis assigns ordinals (often large countable ordinals) to mathematical theories as a measure of their strength. If theories have the same proof-theoretic ordinal they are often equiconsistent, and if one theory has a larger proof-theoretic ordinal than another it can often prove the consistency of the second theory.

In addition to obtaining the proof-theoretic ordinal of a theory, in practice ordinal analysis usually also yields various other pieces of information about the theory being analyzed, for example characterizations of the classes of provably recursive, hyperarithmetical, or $\Delta^1_2$ functions of the theory.

== History ==
The field of ordinal analysis was formed when Gerhard Gentzen in 1934 used cut elimination to prove, in modern terms, that the proof-theoretic ordinal of Peano arithmetic is ε_{0}. See Gentzen's consistency proof.

== Definition ==
Ordinal analysis concerns true, effective (recursive) theories that can interpret a sufficient portion of arithmetic to make statements about ordinal notations.

The proof-theoretic ordinal of such a theory $T$ is the supremum of the order types of all ordinal notations (necessarily recursive, see next section) that the theory can prove are well founded—the supremum of all ordinals $\alpha$ for which there exists a notation $o$ in Kleene's sense such that $T$ proves that $o$ is an ordinal notation. Equivalently, it is the supremum of all ordinals $\alpha$ such that there exists a recursive relation $R$ on $\omega$ (the set of natural numbers) that well-orders it with ordinal $\alpha$ and such that $T$ proves transfinite induction of arithmetical statements for $R$.

=== Ordinal notations ===
Some theories, such as subsystems of second-order arithmetic (Z_{2}), have no conceptualization or way to make arguments about transfinite ordinals. For example, to formalize what it means for a subsystem $T$ of Z_{2} to "prove $\alpha$ well-ordered", we instead construct an ordinal notation $(A,\tilde <)$ with order type $\alpha$. $T$ can now work with various transfinite induction principles along $(A,\tilde <)$, which substitute for reasoning about set-theoretic ordinals.

However, some pathological notation systems exist that are unexpectedly difficult to work with. For example, Rathjen gives a primitive recursive notation system $(\mathbb N,<_T)$ that is well-founded if and only if PA is consistent,^{p. 3} despite having order type $\omega$. Including such a notation in the ordinal analysis of PA would result in the false equality $\mathsf{PTO(PA)}=\omega$.

== Upper bound ==
Since an ordinal notation must be recursive, the proof-theoretic ordinal of any theory is less than or equal to the Church–Kleene ordinal $\omega_1^{\mathrm{CK}}$. In particular, the proof-theoretic ordinal of an inconsistent theory is equal to $\omega_1^{\mathrm{CK}}$, because an inconsistent theory trivially proves that all ordinal notations are well-founded.

For any theory that's both $\Sigma^1_1$-axiomatizable and $\Pi^1_1$-sound, the existence of a recursive ordering that the theory fails to prove is well-ordered follows from the $\Sigma^1_1$ bounding theorem, and said provably well-founded ordinal notations are in fact well-founded by $\Pi^1_1$-soundness. Thus the proof-theoretic ordinal of a $\Pi^1_1$-sound theory that has a $\Sigma^1_1$ axiomatization will always be a (countable) recursive ordinal, that is, strictly less than $\omega_1^{\mathrm{CK}}$.^{Theorem 2.21}

== Examples ==
=== Theories with proof-theoretic ordinal ω ===
- Q, Robinson arithmetic (although the definition of the proof-theoretic ordinal for such weak theories has to be tweaked).
- PA^{–}, the first-order theory of the nonnegative part of a discretely ordered ring.

=== Theories with proof-theoretic ordinal ω^{2} ===
- RFA, rudimentary function arithmetic.
- IΔ_{0}, arithmetic with induction on Δ_{0}-predicates without any axiom asserting that exponentiation is total.

=== Theories with proof-theoretic ordinal ω^{3} ===
- EFA, elementary function arithmetic.
- IΔ_{0} + exp, arithmetic with induction on Δ_{0}-predicates augmented by an axiom asserting that exponentiation is total.
- RCA^{*}_{0}, a second-order form of EFA sometimes used in reverse mathematics.
- WKL^{*}_{0}, a second-order form of EFA sometimes used in reverse mathematics.

Friedman's grand conjecture suggests that much "ordinary" mathematics can be proved in weak systems having this as their proof-theoretic ordinal.

=== Theories with proof-theoretic ordinal ω^{n} (for n = 2, 3, ... ω) ===
- IΔ_{0} or EFA augmented by an axiom ensuring that each element of the n-th level $\mathcal{E}^n$ of the Grzegorczyk hierarchy is total.

=== Theories with proof-theoretic ordinal ω^{ω} ===
- RCA_{0}, recursive comprehension.
- WKL_{0}, weak Kőnig's lemma.
- PRA, primitive recursive arithmetic.
- IΣ_{1}, arithmetic with induction on Σ_{1}-predicates.

=== Theories with proof-theoretic ordinal ε_{0} ===
- PA, Peano arithmetic (shown by Gentzen using cut elimination).
- ACA_{0}, arithmetical comprehension.

=== Theories with proof-theoretic ordinal the Feferman–Schütte ordinal Γ_{0} ===
- ATR_{0}, arithmetical transfinite recursion.
- Martin-Löf type theory with arbitrarily many finite level universes.

This ordinal is sometimes considered to be the upper limit for "predicative" theories.

=== Theories with proof-theoretic ordinal the Bachmann–Howard ordinal ===
- ID_{1}, the first theory of inductive definitions.
- KP, Kripke–Platek set theory with the axiom of infinity.
- CZF, Aczel's constructive Zermelo–Fraenkel set theory.
- EON, a weak variant of the Feferman's explicit mathematics system T_{0}.

The Kripke–Platek or CZF set theories are weak set theories without axioms for the full powerset given as set of all subsets. Instead, they tend to either have axioms of restricted separation and formation of new sets, or they grant existence of certain function spaces (exponentiation) instead of carving them out from bigger relations.

=== Theories with larger proof-theoretic ordinals ===
Unsolved problem in mathematics
What is the proof-theoretic ordinal of full second-order arithmetic?
More unsolved problems in mathematics
- $\Pi^1_1\mbox{-}\mathsf{CA}_0$, Π_{1}^{1} comprehension has a rather large proof-theoretic ordinal, which was described by Takeuti in terms of "ordinal diagrams", and which is bounded by ψ_{0}(Ω_{ω}) in Buchholz's notation. It is also the ordinal of ID_{ω}, the theory of finitely iterated inductive definitions. And also the ordinal of MLW, Martin-Löf type theory with indexed W-Types.
- ID_{ω}, the theory of ω-iterated inductive definitions. Its proof-theoretic ordinal is equal to the Takeuti–Feferman–Buchholz ordinal.
- T_{0}, Feferman's constructive system of explicit mathematics has a larger proof-theoretic ordinal, which is also the proof-theoretic ordinal of the KPi, Kripke–Platek set theory with iterated admissibles and $\Sigma^1_2\mbox{-}\mathsf{AC} + \mathsf{BI}$.
- KPi, an extension of Kripke–Platek set theory based on a recursively inaccessible ordinal, has a very large proof-theoretic ordinal $\psi(\varepsilon_{I + 1})$ described in a 1983 paper of Jäger and Pohlers, where I is the smallest inaccessible. This ordinal is also the proof-theoretic ordinal of $\Delta^1_2\mbox{-}\mathsf{CA} + \mathsf{BI}$.
- KPM, an extension of Kripke–Platek set theory based on a recursively Mahlo ordinal, has a very large proof-theoretic ordinal θ.
- TTM, an extension of Martin-Löf type theory by one Mahlo-universe, has an even larger proof-theoretic ordinal $\psi_{\Omega_1}(\Omega_{M+\omega})$.
- $\mathsf{KP} + \Pi_3 - Ref$ has a proof-theoretic ordinal equal to $\Psi(\varepsilon_{K + 1})$, where $K$ refers to the first weakly compact, due to (Rathjen 1993)
- $\mathsf{KP} + \Pi_\omega - Ref$ has a proof-theoretic ordinal equal to $\Psi^{\varepsilon_{\Xi + 1}}_X$, where $\Xi$ refers to the first $\Pi^2_0$-indescribable and $\mathbb{X} = (\omega^+; P_0; \epsilon, \epsilon, 0)$.
- $\mathsf{Stability}$ has a proof-theoretic ordinal equal to $\Psi^{\varepsilon_{\Upsilon+1}}_{\mathbb{X}}$ where $\Upsilon$ is a cardinal analogue of the least ordinal $\alpha$ which is $(\alpha+\beta)$-stable for all $\beta < \alpha$ and $\mathbb{X} = (\omega^+; P_0; \epsilon, \epsilon, 0)$.

Most theories capable of describing the power set of the natural numbers have proof-theoretic ordinals that are so large that no explicit combinatorial description has yet been given. This includes $\Pi^1_2 - CA_0$, full second-order arithmetic ($\Pi^1_\infty - CA_0$) and set theories with powersets including ZF and ZFC. The strength of intuitionistic ZF (IZF) equals that of ZF.

== Table of ordinal analyses ==
Table of proof-theoretic ordinals
Ordinal	First-order arithmetic	Second-order arithmetic	Kripke–Platek set theory	Type theory	Constructive set theory	Explicit mathematics
$\omega$	$\mathsf{Q}$, $\mathsf{PA}^-$					
$\omega^2$	$\mathsf{RFA}$, $\mathsf{I\Delta}_0$					
$\omega^3$	$\mathsf{EFA}$, $\mathsf{I\Delta}_0^{\mathsf{+}}$, $\mathsf B\Sigma_1$^{Theorem 4.1}	$\mathsf{RCA}_0^*$, $\mathsf{WKL}_0^*$				
$\omega^n$	$\mathsf{EFA}^{\mathsf{n}}$, $\mathsf{I\Delta}_0^{\mathsf{n+}}$					
$\omega^\omega$	$\mathsf{PRA}$, $\mathsf{I\Sigma}_1$^{p. 13}	$\mathsf{RCA}_0$^{p. 13}, $\mathsf{WKL}_0$^{p. 13}		$\mathsf{CPRC}$		
$\omega^{\omega^\omega}$	$\mathsf I\Sigma_2$^{p. 13}					
$\omega^{\omega^{\omega^\omega}}$	$\mathsf I\Sigma_3$^{p. 13}	$\mathsf{RCA}_0+(\Pi^0_2)^-\mathsf{-IND}$				
$\omega\uparrow\uparrow(n+1)$	$\mathsf I\Sigma_n$^{p. 13}					
$\varepsilon_0$	$\mathsf{PA}$^{p. 13}	$\mathsf{ACA}_0$^{p. 13}, $\mathsf{\Sigma}_1^1\mathsf{-AC}_0$^{p. 13}, $\text{R-}\widehat{\mathbf{E}\boldsymbol{\Omega}}$^{p. 8}, $\mathsf{RCA}$^{p. 148}, $\mathsf{WKL}$^{p. 148}, $\mathsf{\Delta}_1^1\mathsf{-CA}_0$	$\mathrm{KPu}^r$			$\mathsf{EM}_0$
$\varepsilon_\omega$		$\mathsf{ACA}_0+\mathsf{iRT}$, $\mathsf{RCA}_0+\forall Y\forall n\exists X(\textrm{TJ}(n,X,Y))$				
$\varepsilon_{\varepsilon_0}$		$\mathsf{ACA}$^{p. 959}				
$\zeta_0$		$\mathsf{ACA}_0+\forall X\exists Y(\textrm{TJ}(\omega,X,Y))$, $\mathsf p_1(\mathsf{ACA}_0)$, $\mathsf{RFN}_0$^{p. 17}, $\mathsf{ACA}_0+(\mathsf{BR})$^{p. 5}				
$\varphi(2,\varepsilon_0)$		$\mathsf{RFN}$, $\mathsf{ACA}+\forall X\exists Y(\textrm{TJ}(\omega,X,Y))$^{p. 52}				
$\varphi(\omega, 0)$	$\mathsf{ID}_1\#$, $\mathsf{TID}_0$^{p. 137}	$\mathsf{\Delta}_1^1\mathsf{-CR}$, $\Sigma^1_1\mathsf{-DC}_0$				$\mathsf{EM}_0 \mathsf{+JR}$
$\varphi(\varepsilon_0, 0)$	$\widehat{\mathsf{ID}}_1$, $\mathsf{KFL}$^{p. 17}, $\mathsf{KF}$^{p. 17}	$\mathsf{\Delta}_1^1\mathsf{-CA}$^{p. 140}, $\mathsf{\Sigma}_1^1\mathsf{-AC}$^{p. 140}, $\mathsf{\Sigma}_1^1\mathsf{-DC}$^{p. 140}, $\text{W-}\widehat{\mathbf{E}\boldsymbol{\Omega}}$^{p. 8}	$\mathrm{KPu}^r+(\mathrm{IND}_N)$	$\mathsf{ML}_1$		$\mathsf{EM}_0 \mathsf{+J}$
$\varphi(\varepsilon_{\varepsilon_0}, 0)$		$\widehat{\mathbf{E}\boldsymbol{\Omega}}$^{p. 27}, $\widehat{\mathbf{EID}}_{\boldsymbol{1}}$^{p. 27}				
$\varphi(\varphi(\omega,0), 0)$	$\mathrm{PRS}\omega$^{p. 9}					
$\varphi(\mathsf{<}\Omega, 0)$	$\mathsf{Aut(ID\#)}$					
$\Gamma_0$	$\widehat{\mathsf{ID}}_{<\omega}$, $\mathsf{U(PA)}$, $\mathbf{KFL}^*$^{p. 22}, $\mathbf{KF}^*$^{p. 22}, $\mathcal U(\mathrm{NFA})$, $\mathsf{TID}_0^+$^{p. 137}	$\mathsf{ATR}_0$, $\mathsf{\Delta}_1^1\mathsf{-CA+BR}$, $\Delta^1_1\mathrm{-CA}_0+\mathrm{(SUB)}$, $\mathrm{FP}_0$^{p. 26}	$\mathsf{KPi}^0$, $\mathsf{KPu}^0+(\mathrm{BR})$	$\mathsf{ML}_{<\omega}$, $\mathsf{MLU}$		
$\Gamma_{\omega^\omega}$			$\mathsf{KPI}^0 + (\mathsf{ \Sigma_1-I}_\omega)$^{p. 13}			
$\Gamma_{\varepsilon_0}$	$\widehat{\mathsf{ID}}_{\omega}$	$\mathsf{ATR}$	$\mathsf{KPI}^0 \mathsf{ + F-I}_\omega$			
$\varphi(1, \omega, 0)$	$\widehat{\mathsf{ID}}_{<\omega^\omega}$	$\mathsf{ATR}_0+(\mathsf{\Sigma}_1^1\mathsf{-DC})$	$\mathsf{KPi}^0 \mathsf{ + \Sigma_1-I}_\omega$			
$\varphi(1, \varepsilon_0, 0)$	$\widehat{\mathsf{ID}}_{<\varepsilon_0}$	$\mathsf{ATR}+(\mathsf{\Sigma}_1^1\mathsf{-DC})$	$\mathsf{KPi}^0 \mathsf{ + F-I}_\omega$			
$\varphi(1, \Gamma_0, 0)$	$\widehat{\mathsf{ID}}_{<\Gamma_0}$			$\mathsf{MLS}$		
$\varphi(2, 0, 0)$	$\mathsf{Aut(\widehat{ID})}$, $\mathsf{FTR}_0$	$Ax_{\Sigma^1_1\mathsf{-AC}}\mathsf{TR}_0$^{p. 1167}, $Ax_{\mathsf{ATR}+\Sigma^1_1\mathsf{-DC}}\mathsf{RFN}_0$^{p. 1167}	$\mathsf{KPh}^0$	$\mathsf{Aut(ML)}$		
$\varphi(2, 0, \varepsilon_0)$	$\mathsf{FTR}$	$Ax_{\Sigma^1_1\mathsf{-AC}}\mathsf{TR}$^{p. 1167}, $Ax_{\mathsf{ATR}+\Sigma^1_1\mathsf{-DC}}\mathsf{RFN}$^{p. 1167}				
$\varphi(2, \varepsilon_0, 0)$			$\mathsf{KPh}_0+(\mathsf{F-I}_\omega)$			
$\varphi(\omega, 0, 0)$		$(\Pi^1_2\mathsf{-RFN})^{\Sigma^1_1\mathsf{-DC}}_0$^{p. 233}, $\Sigma^1_1\mathsf{-TDC}_0$^{p. 233}	$\mathsf{KPm}^0$^{p. 276}	$\mathsf{EMA}$^{p. 276}		
$\varphi(\varepsilon_0, 0, 0)$		$(\Pi^1_2\mathsf{-RFN})^{\Sigma^1_1\mathsf{-DC}}$^{p. 233}, $\Sigma^1_1\mathsf{-TDC}$	$\mathsf{KPm}^0+(\mathcal{L}^*\mathsf{-I}_\mathsf{N})$^{p. 277}	$\mathsf{EMA}+(\mathbb{L}\mathsf{-I}_\mathsf{N})$^{p. 277}		
$\varphi(1, 0, 0, 0)$		$\mathsf p_1(\Sigma^1_1\mathsf{-TDC}_0)$				
$\psi_{\Omega_1}(\Omega^{\Omega^\omega})$		$\mathsf{RCA}_0^*+\Pi^1_1\mathsf{-CA}^-$, $\mathsf p_3(\mathsf{ACA}_0)$				
$\vartheta(\Omega^\Omega)$	$\mathsf{TID}$, $\mathsf{TID}_1$^{p. 171}	$\mathsf p_1(\mathsf p_3(\mathsf{ACA}_0))$		$\mathsf{FIT}$^{p. 171}		
$\psi_0(\varepsilon_{\Omega+1})$	$\mathsf{ID}_1$	$\text{W-}\widetilde{\mathbf{E}\boldsymbol{\Omega}}$^{p. 8}	$\mathsf{KP}$, $\mathsf{KP\omega}$, $\mathrm{KPu}$	$\mathsf{ML}_1\mathsf{V}$	$\mathsf{CZF}$	$\mathsf{EON}$
$\psi(\varepsilon_{\Omega+\varepsilon_0})$		$\widetilde{\mathbf{E}\boldsymbol{\Omega}}$^{p. 31}, $\widetilde{\mathbf{EID}}_{\boldsymbol{1}}$^{p. 31}, $\mathbf{ACA}+(\Pi^1_1\text{-CA})^-$^{p. 31}				
$\psi(\varepsilon_{\Omega+\Omega})$		$(\mathsf{ID}^2_1)_0+\mathsf{BR}$				
$\psi(\varepsilon_{\varepsilon_{\Omega+1}})$		$\mathbf{E}\boldsymbol{\Omega}$^{p. 33}, $\mathbf{EID}_{\boldsymbol{1}}$^{p. 33}, $\mathbf{ACA}+(\Pi^1_1\text{-CA})^-+(\mathrm{BI}_\mathrm{PR})^-$^{p. 33}				
$\psi_0(\Gamma_{\Omega+1})$	$\mathsf{U(ID}_1\mathsf{)}$, $\widehat{\mathsf{ID}}^\bullet_{<\omega}$^{p. 26}, $\Sigma^1_1\mathsf{-DC}^\bullet_0+(\mathsf{SUB}^\bullet)$^{p. 26}, $\mathsf{ATR}^\bullet_0$^{p. 26}, $\Sigma^1_1\mathsf{-AC}^\bullet_0+(\mathsf{SUB}^\bullet)$^{p. 26}, $\mathcal U(\mathsf{ID}_1)$^{p. 26}	$\mathsf{FP}^\bullet_0$^{p. 26}, $\mathsf{ATR}^\bullet_0$^{p. 26}				
$\psi_0(\varphi(\mathsf{<}\Omega, 0, \Omega+1))$	$\mathsf{Aut(U(ID))}$					
$\psi_0(\Omega_\omega)$	$\mathsf{ID}_{<\omega}$^{p. 28}	$\mathsf{\Pi}_1^1\mathsf{-CA}_0$^{p. 28}, $\mathsf{\Delta}_2^1\mathsf{-CA}_0$		$\mathsf{MLW}$		$\mathsf{SUS}+(\mathsf{S}-\mathsf{I}_\mathsf{N})$^{p. 27}
$\psi_0(\Omega_\omega\omega^\omega)$		$\Pi^1_1\mathsf{-CA}_0+\Pi^1_2\mathsf{-IND}$				
$\psi_0(\Omega_\omega\varepsilon_0)$	$\mathsf{W-ID}_{\omega}$	$\mathsf{\Pi}_1^1\mathsf{-CA}$				
$\psi_0(\Omega_\omega\Omega)$		$\Pi^1_1\mathsf{-CA+BR}$				
$\psi_0(\Omega_\omega^\omega)$		$\Pi^1_1\mathsf{-CA}_0+\Pi^1_2\mathsf{-BI}$				
$\psi_0(\Omega_\omega^{\omega^\omega})$		$\Pi^1_1\mathsf{-CA}_0+\Pi^1_2\mathsf{-BI}+\Pi^1_3\mathsf{-IND}$				
$\psi_0(\varepsilon_{\Omega_\omega+1})$	$\mathsf{ID}_{\omega}$	$\mathsf{\Pi}_1^1\mathsf{-CA+BI}$	$\mathsf{KPI}$			
$\psi_0(\Omega_{\omega^\omega})$	$\mathsf{ID}_{<\omega^\omega}$	$\mathsf{\Delta}_2^1\mathsf{-CR}$^{p. 28}				$\mathsf{SUS}+(\mathsf{N}-\mathsf{I}_\mathsf{N})$^{p. 27}
$\psi_0(\Omega_{\varepsilon_0})$	$\mathsf{ID}_{<\varepsilon_0}$	$\mathsf{\Delta}_2^1\mathsf{-CA}$^{p. 28}, $\mathsf{\Sigma}_2^1\mathsf{-AC}$	$\mathsf{W-KPi}$			$\mathsf{SUS}+(\mathrm{L}-\mathsf{I}_\mathsf{N})$^{p. 27}
$\psi_0(\Omega_\Omega)$	$\mathsf{Aut(ID)}$					
$\psi_{\Omega_1}(\varepsilon_{\Omega_\Omega+1})$	$\mathsf{ID}_{\prec^*}$, $\mathsf{BID}^{2*}$, $\mathsf{ID}^{2*}+\mathsf{BI}$		$\mathsf{KPl}^*$, $\mathsf{KPl}^r_\Omega$			
$\psi_0(\Phi_1(0))$		$\Pi^1_1\mathsf{-TR}_0$, $\Pi^1_1\mathsf{-TR}_0+\Delta^1_2\mathsf{-CA}_0$, $\Delta^1_2\mathsf{-CA+BI(impl-}\Sigma^1_2)$,$\Delta^1_2\mathsf{-CA+BR(impl-}\Sigma^1_2)$,$\mathbf{AUT-ID}^{pos}_0$, $\mathbf{AUT-ID}^{mon}_0$	$\mathsf{KPi}^w+\mathsf{FOUNDR}(\mathsf{impl-})\Sigma)$, $\mathsf{KPi}^w+\mathsf{FOUND}(\mathsf{impl-})\Sigma)$, $\mathbf{AUT-KPl}^r$, $\mathbf{AUT-KPl}^r+\mathbf{KPi}^r$			
$\psi_0(\Phi_1(0)\varepsilon_0)$		$\Pi^1_1\mathsf{-TR}$, $\mathbf{AUT-ID}^{pos}$, $\mathbf{AUT-ID}^{mon}$	$\mathbf{AUT-KPl}^w$			
$\psi_0(\varepsilon_{\Phi_1(0)+1})$		$\Pi^1_1\mathsf{-TR}+(\mathsf{BI})$, $\mathbf{AUT-ID}^{pos}_2$, $\mathbf{AUT-ID}^{mon}_2$	$\mathbf{AUT-KPl}$			
$\psi_0(\Phi_1(\varepsilon_0))$		$\Pi^1_1\mathsf{-TR}+\Delta^1_2\mathsf{-CA}$, $\Pi^1_1\mathsf{-TR}+\Sigma^1_2\mathsf{-AC}$	$\mathbf{AUT-KPl}^w+\mathbf{KPi}^w$			
$\psi_0(\Phi_\omega(0))$		$\Delta^1_2\mathsf{-TR}_0$, $\Sigma^1_2\mathsf{-TRDC}_0$, $\Delta^1_2\mathsf{-CA}_0+(\Sigma^1_2\mathsf{-BI})$	$\mathbf{KPi}^r+(\Sigma\mathsf{-FOUND})$, $\mathbf{KPi}^r+(\Sigma\mathsf{-REC})$			
$\psi_0(\Phi_{\varepsilon_0}(0))$		$\Delta^1_2\mathsf{-TR}$, $\Sigma^1_2\mathsf{-TRDC}$, $\Delta^1_2\mathsf{-CA}+(\Sigma^1_2\mathsf{-BI})$	$\mathbf{KPi}^w+(\Sigma\mathsf{-FOUND})$, $\mathbf{KPi}^w+(\Sigma\mathsf{-REC})$			
$\psi(\varepsilon_{I+1})$		$\mathsf{\Delta}_2^1\mathsf{-CA+BI}$^{p. 28}, $\mathsf{\Sigma}_2^1\mathsf{-AC+BI}$	$\mathsf{KPi}$		$\mathsf{CZF+REA}$	$\mathsf{T}_0$
$\psi(\Omega_{I+\omega})$				$\mathsf{ML}_1\mathsf{W}$		
$\psi(\Omega_L)$			$\mathsf{KPh}$	$\mathsf{ML}_{<\omega}\mathsf{W}$		
$\psi(\Omega_{L^*})$				$\mathsf{Aut(MLW)}$		
$\psi_\Omega(\chi_{\varepsilon_{M+1}}(0))$		$\mathsf{\Delta}_2^1\mathsf{-CA+BI+(M)}$	$\mathsf{KPM}$		$\mathsf{CZFM}$	
$\psi(\Omega_{M+\omega})$			$\mathsf{KPM}^+$	$\mathsf{TTM}$		
$\Psi^0_\Omega(\varepsilon_{K+1})$			$\mathsf{KP + \Pi}_3 - \mathsf{Ref}$			
$\Psi^{\varepsilon_{\Xi+1}}_{(\omega^+; P_0, \epsilon, \epsilon, 0)}$			$\mathsf{KP + \Pi}_\omega - \mathsf{Ref}$			
$\Psi^{\varepsilon_{\Upsilon+1}}_{(\omega^+; P_0, \epsilon, \epsilon, 0)}$			$\mathsf{Stability}$			
$\psi_{\omega_1^{CK}}(\varepsilon_{\mathbb S^++1})$			$\mathsf{KP}\omega+\Pi_1^1-\mathsf{Ref}$, $\mathsf{KP}\omega+(M\prec_{\Sigma_1}V)$			
$\psi_{\omega_1^{CK}}(\varepsilon_{\mathbb I+1})$		$\Sigma_3^1\mathsf{-DC+BI}$, $\Sigma_3^1\mathsf{-AC+BI}$	$\mathsf{KP}\omega+\Pi_1-\mathsf{Collection}+(V=L)$			
$\psi_{\omega_1^{CK}}(\varepsilon_{\mathbb I_N+1})$		$\Sigma_{N+2}^1\mathsf{-DC+BI}$, $\Sigma_{N+2}^1\mathsf{-AC+BI}$	$\mathsf{KP}\omega+\Pi_N-\mathsf{Collection}+(V=L)$			
$\psi_{\omega_1^{CK}}(\mathbb I_{\omega})$	$\mathsf{PA}+\bigcup\limits_{N<\omega}\mathsf{TI}[\Pi_0^{1-},\psi_{\omega_1^{CK}}(\varepsilon_{\mathbb I_N+1})]$	$\mathbf{Z}_2$, $\Pi^1_\infty - \mathsf{CA}$, Bar	$\mathsf{KP}+\Pi_\omega^{\text{set}}-\mathsf{Separation}$	$\lambda 2$	$\mathsf{CZF+Sep}$	

=== Key ===
This is a list of symbols used in this table:

- ψ represents various ordinal collapsing functions as defined in their respective citations.
- Ψ represents either Rathjen's or Stegert's Psi.
- φ represents Veblen's function.
- ω represents the first transfinite ordinal.
- ε_{α} represents the epsilon numbers.
- Γ_{α} represents the gamma numbers (Γ_{0} is the Feferman–Schütte ordinal)
- Ω_{α} represent the uncountable ordinals (Ω_{1}, abbreviated Ω, is ω_{1}). All proof-theoretic ordinals are countable.
- $\mathbb S$ is an ordinal term denoting a stable ordinal, and $\mathbb S^+$ the least admissible ordinal above $\mathbb S$.
- $\mathbb I_N$ is an ordinal term denoting an ordinal such that $L_{\mathbb{I}_N}\models\mathsf{KP}\omega+\Pi_N-\mathsf{Collection}+(V=L)$; N is a variable that defines a series of ordinal analyses of the results of $\Pi_N-\mathsf{Collection}$ forall $1 \leq N < \omega$. when N=1, $\psi_{\omega_1^{CK}}(\varepsilon_{\mathbb I_1+1})=\psi_{\omega_1^{CK}}(\varepsilon_{\mathbb I+1})$
- Additional symbols can be found in the notes.

This is a list of the abbreviations used in this table:

- First-order arithmetic
  - $\mathsf{Q}$ is Robinson arithmetic
  - $\mathsf{PA}^-$ is the first-order theory of the nonnegative part of a discretely ordered ring.
  - $\mathsf{RFA}$ is rudimentary function arithmetic.
  - $\mathsf{I\Delta}_0$ is arithmetic with induction restricted to Δ_{0}-predicates without any axiom asserting that exponentiation is total.
  - $\mathsf{EFA}$ is elementary function arithmetic.
  - $\mathsf{I\Delta}_0^{\mathsf{+}}$ is arithmetic with induction restricted to Δ_{0}-predicates augmented by an axiom asserting that exponentiation is total.
  - $\mathsf{EFA}^{\mathsf{n}}$ is elementary function arithmetic augmented by an axiom ensuring that each element of the n-th level $\mathcal{E}^n$ of the Grzegorczyk hierarchy is total.
  - $\mathsf{I\Delta}_0^{\mathsf{n+}}$ is $\mathsf{I\Delta}_0^{\mathsf{+}}$ augmented by an axiom ensuring that each element of the n-th level $\mathcal{E}^n$ of the Grzegorczyk hierarchy is total.
  - $\mathsf{PRA}$ is primitive recursive arithmetic.
  - $\mathsf{I\Sigma}_1$ is arithmetic with induction restricted to Σ_{1}-predicates.
  - $\mathsf{PA}$ is Peano arithmetic.
  - $\mathsf{ID}_\nu\#$ is $\widehat{\mathsf{ID}}_\nu$ but with induction only for positive formulas.
  - $\widehat{\mathsf{ID}}_\nu$ extends PA by ν iterated fixed points of monotone operators.
  - $\mathsf{U(PA)}$ is not exactly a first-order arithmetic system, but captures what one can get by predicative reasoning based on the natural numbers.
  - $\mathsf{Aut(\widehat{ID})}$ is autonomously iterated $\widehat{\mathsf{ID}}_\nu$ (in other words, once an ordinal is defined, it can be used to index a new series of definitions.)
  - $\mathsf{ID}_\nu$ extends PA by ν iterated least fixed points of monotone operators.
  - $\mathsf{U(ID}_\nu\mathsf{)}$ is not exactly a first-order arithmetic system, but captures what one can get by predicative reasoning based on ν-times iterated generalized inductive definitions.
  - $\mathsf{Aut(U(ID))}$ is autonomously iterated $\mathsf{U(ID}_\nu\mathsf{)}$.
  - $\mathsf{W-ID}_{\nu}$ is a weakened version of $\mathsf{ID}_{\nu}$ based on W-types.
  - $\mathsf{TI}[\Pi_0^{1-},\alpha]$ is a transfinite induction of length α no more than $\Pi_0^1$-formulas. It happens to be the representation of the ordinal notation when used in first-order arithmetic.
- Second-order arithmetic

In general, a subscript 0 means that the induction scheme is restricted to a single set induction axiom.

  - $\mathsf{RCA}_0^*$ is a second order form of $\mathsf{EFA}$ sometimes used in reverse mathematics.
  - $\mathsf{WKL}_0^*$ is a second order form of $\mathsf{EFA}$ sometimes used in reverse mathematics.
  - $\mathsf{RCA}_0$ is recursive comprehension.
  - $\mathsf{WKL}_0$ is weak Kőnig's lemma.
  - $\mathsf{ACA}_0$ is arithmetical comprehension.
  - $\mathsf{ACA}$ is $\mathsf{ACA}_0$ plus the full second-order induction scheme.
  - $\mathsf{TJ}(n, X, Y)$ is the predicate "the nth Turing jump of X is Y".
  - $\mathsf{ATR}_0$ is arithmetical transfinite recursion.
  - $\mathsf{ATR}$ is $\mathsf{ATR}_0$ plus the full second-order induction scheme.
  - $\mathsf{BI}$ is the bar induction axiom.
  - $\mathsf{\Delta}_2^1\mathsf{-CA+BI+(M)}$ is $\mathsf{\Delta}_2^1\mathsf{-CA+BI}$ plus the assertion "every true $\mathsf{\Pi}^1_3$-sentence with parameters holds in a (countable coded) $\beta$-model of $\mathsf{\Delta}_2^1\mathsf{-CA}$".
- Kripke–Platek set theory
  - $\mathsf{KP}$ is Kripke–Platek set theory with the axiom of infinity.
  - $\mathsf{KP\omega}$ is Kripke–Platek set theory, whose universe is an admissible set containing $\omega$.
  - $\mathsf{W-KPI}$ is a weakened version of $\mathsf{KPI}$ based on W-types.
  - $\mathsf{KPI}$ asserts that the universe is a limit of admissible sets.
  - $\mathsf{W-KPi}$ is a weakened version of $\mathsf{KPi}$ based on W-types.
  - $\mathsf{KPi}$ asserts that the universe is inaccessible sets.
  - $\mathsf{KPh}$ asserts that the universe is hyperinaccessible: an inaccessible set and a limit of inaccessible sets.
  - $\mathsf{KPM}$ asserts that the universe is a Mahlo set.
  - $\mathsf{KP + \Pi}_\mathsf{n} - \mathsf{Ref}$ is $\mathsf{KP}$ augmented by a certain first-order reflection scheme.
  - $\mathsf{Stability}$ is KPi augmented by the axiom $\forall \alpha \exists \kappa \geq \alpha (L_\kappa \preceq_1 L_{\kappa + \alpha})$.
  - $\mathsf{KPM}^+$ is KPI augmented by the assertion "at least one recursively Mahlo ordinal exists".
  - $\mathsf{KP}\omega+(M\prec_{\Sigma_1}V)$ is $\mathsf{KP}\omega$ with an axiom stating that 'there exists a non-empty and transitive set M such that $M\prec_{\Sigma_1}V$'.

A superscript zero indicates that $\in$-induction is removed (making the theory significantly weaker).

- Type theory
  - $\mathsf{CPRC}$ is the Herbelin-Patey Calculus of Primitive Recursive Constructions.
  - $\mathsf{ML}_\mathsf{n}$ is type theory without W-types and with $n$ universes.
  - $\mathsf{ML}_{<\omega}$ is type theory without W-types and with finitely many universes.
  - $\mathsf{MLU}$ is type theory with a next universe operator.
  - $\mathsf{MLS}$ is type theory without W-types and with a superuniverse.
  - $\mathsf{Aut(ML)}$ is type theory without W-types and with autonomously iterated universes.
  - $\mathsf{ML}_1\mathsf{V}$ is type theory with one universe and Aczel's type of iterative sets.
  - $\mathsf{MLW}$ is type theory with indexed W-Types.
  - $\mathsf{ML}_1\mathsf{W}$ is type theory with W-types and one universe.
  - $\mathsf{ML}_{<\omega}\mathsf{W}$ is type theory with W-types and finitely many universes.
  - $\mathsf{Aut(MLW)}$ is type theory with W-types and with autonomously iterated universes.
  - $\mathsf{TTM}$ is type theory with a Mahlo universe.
  - $\lambda 2$ is System F, also polymorphic lambda calculus or second-order lambda calculus.
- Constructive set theory
  - $\mathsf{CZF}$ is Aczel's constructive set theory.
  - $\mathsf{CZF+REA}$ is $\mathsf{CZF}$ plus the regular extension axiom.
  - $\mathsf{CZF+REA+FZ}_2$ is $\mathsf{CZF+REA}$ plus the full-second order induction scheme.
  - $\mathsf{CZFM}$ is $\mathsf{CZF}$ with a Mahlo universe.
- Explicit mathematics
  - $\mathsf{EM}_0$ is basic explicit mathematics plus elementary comprehension
  - $\mathsf{EM}_0 \mathsf{+JR}$ is $\mathsf{EM}_0$ plus join rule
  - $\mathsf{EM}_0 \mathsf{+J}$ is $\mathsf{EM}_0$ plus join axioms
  - $\mathsf{EON}$ is a weak variant of the Feferman's $\mathsf{T}_0$.
  - $\mathsf{T}_0$ is $\mathsf{EM}_0 \mathsf{+J+IG}$, where $\mathsf{IG}$ is inductive generation.
  - $\mathsf{T}$ is $\mathsf{EM}_0 \mathsf{+J+IG+FZ}_2$, where $\mathsf{FZ}_2$ is the full second-order induction scheme.

== See also ==
- Equiconsistency
- Large cardinal property
- Feferman–Schütte ordinal
- Bachmann–Howard ordinal
- Complexity class
- Gentzen's consistency proof

== Notes ==
1.For $1 < n \leq \mathsf{\omega}$
2.The Veblen function $\varphi$ with countably infinitely iterated least fixed points.
3.Can also be commonly written as $\psi(\varepsilon_{\Omega+1})$ in Madore's ψ.
4.Uses Madore's ψ rather than Buchholz's ψ.
5.Can also be commonly written as $\psi(\varepsilon_{\Omega_\omega+1})$ in Madore's ψ.
6.$K$ represents the first recursively weakly compact ordinal. Uses Arai's ψ rather than Buchholz's ψ.
7.Also the proof-theoretic ordinal of $\mathsf{Aut(W-ID)}$, as the amount of weakening given by the W-types is not enough.
8.$I$ represents the first inaccessible cardinal. Uses Jäger's ψ rather than Buchholz's ψ.
9.$L$ represents the limit of the $\omega$-inaccessible cardinals. Uses (presumably) Jäger's ψ.
10.$L^*$represents the limit of the $\Omega$-inaccessible cardinals. Uses (presumably) Jäger's ψ.
11.$M$ represents the first Mahlo cardinal. Uses Rathjen's ψ rather than Buchholz's ψ.
12.$K$ represents the first weakly compact cardinal. Uses Rathjen's Ψ rather than Buchholz's ψ.
13.$\Xi$ represents the first $\Pi^2_0$-indescribable cardinal. Uses Stegert's Ψ rather than Buchholz's ψ.
14.$Y$ is the smallest $\alpha$ such that $\forall \theta < Y \exists \kappa < Y ($'$\kappa$ is $\theta$-indescribable') and $\forall \theta < Y \forall \kappa < Y ($'$\kappa$ is $\theta$-indescribable $\rightarrow \theta < \kappa$'). Uses Stegert's Ψ rather than Buchholz's ψ.
15.$M$ represents the first Mahlo cardinal. Uses (presumably) Rathjen's ψ.
16.For $n \in \mathbb{N}, n \geq 1$. $\omega\uparrow\uparrow n (n \in \mathbb{N})$ represents tetration (denoted as $\omega_{n}$ in the source)
