= Heinz Bachmann =

Swiss mathematician (1924–2022)

- Born: 1924
- Died: 22 April 2022 (aged 97–98)
- Occupation: Mathematician

Heinz Bachmann (1924 – 22 April 2022) was a mathematician who worked at the Eidgenössische Sternwarte (federal observatory) in Zürich. He introduced the Bachmann–Howard ordinal and ordinal collapsing functions, which are essential tools in studying proof-theoretic ordinals. He also published mathematics textbooks and worked in astronomy and meteorology.

== Works ==
- Bachmann, Heinz (1950), "Die Normalfunktionen und das Problem der ausgezeichneten Folgen von Ordnungszahlen", Vierteljschr. Naturforsch. Ges. Zürich, 95: 115–147, MR 0036806
- Bachmann, Heinz (1955), Transfinite Zahlen, Ergebnisse der Mathematik und ihrer Grenzgebiete (N.F.), Heft 1., Springer-Verlag, Berlin-Göttingen-Heidelberg, ISBN 978-3642885150, MR 0071481
- Bachmann, Heinz (2007). Vektorgeometrie: Theorie, Aufgaben und Ergebnisse (in German). sabe, Verlag-Inst. für Lehrmittel. ISBN 978-3-252-06041-1.
