= Schlössli Buchholz =

Castle in Berneck, Switzerland

- Herrensitz Buchholz; Château de Buchholz
- Schlössli Buechholz in 2015
- Interactive map of Schlössli Buchholz
- 47°25′01″N 9°36′58″E
- Location: Buechholzstrasse 4 Berneck, St. Gallen, Switzerland

Schlössli Buchholz, also known as Herrensitz Buchholz, is a castle in Berneck, Switzerland.

== History ==
The manor house was built circa 1421. It belonged to Hugo Gnäsper, a feudal vassal of the Abbey of Saint Gall. It later passed through his daughter to Kaspar Rugg von Tannegg. A chapel was added in 1462.

== See also ==
- Buchholz Manor
- Schloss Buchholz
