= Buckholt =

Buckholt may refer to:

- Buckholt, Hampshire, England
- Buckholt, Monmouthshire, Wales

== See also ==
- Buchholz
- Buckholts, Texas, USA
