= Takeuti–Feferman–Buchholz ordinal =

Large countable ordinal

In the mathematical fields of set theory and proof theory, the Takeuti–Feferman–Buchholz ordinal (TFBO) is a large countable ordinal, which acts as the limit of the range of Buchholz's psi function and Feferman's theta function. It was named by David Madore, after Gaisi Takeuti, Solomon Feferman and Wilfried Buchholz. It is written as $\psi_0(\varepsilon_{\Omega_\omega + 1})$ using Buchholz's psi function, an ordinal collapsing function invented by Wilfried Buchholz, and $\theta_{\varepsilon_{\Omega_\omega + 1}}(0)$ in Feferman's theta function, an ordinal collapsing function invented by Solomon Feferman. It is the proof-theoretic ordinal of several formal theories:

- $\Pi_1^1\textsf{-CA} + \textsf{BI}$, a subsystem of second-order arithmetic
- $\Pi_1^1$-comprehension + transfinite induction
- ID_{ω}, the system of ω-times iterated inductive definitions

== Definition ==
- Let $\Omega_\alpha$ represent the smallest uncountable ordinal with cardinality $\aleph_\alpha$.
- Let $\varepsilon_\beta$ represent the $\beta$th epsilon number, equal to the $1+\beta$th fixed point of $\alpha \mapsto \omega^\alpha$
- Let $\psi$ represent Buchholz's psi function
