= Buchholz's ordinal =

Large countably-infinite ordinal number

In mathematics, ψ_{0}(Ω_{ω}), widely known as Buchholz's ordinal, is a large countable ordinal that is used to measure the proof-theoretic strength of some mathematical systems. In particular, it is the proof-theoretic ordinal of the subsystem $\Pi_1^1$-CA_{0} of second-order arithmetic; this is one of the "big five" subsystems studied in reverse mathematics (Simpson 1999). It is also the proof-theoretic ordinal of $\mathsf{ID_{<\omega}}$, the theory of finitely iterated inductive definitions, and of $KP\ell_0$, a fragment of Kripke–Platek set theory extended by an axiom stating every set is contained in an admissible set. Buchholz's ordinal is also the order type of the segment bounded by $D_0D_\omega0$ in Buchholz's ordinal notation $\mathsf{(OT, <)}$. Lastly, it can be expressed as the limit of the sequence: $\varepsilon_0 = \psi_0(\Omega)$, $\mathsf{BHO} = \psi_0(\Omega_2)$, $\psi_0(\Omega_3)$, ...

== Definition ==
- $\Omega_0 = 1$, and $\Omega_n = \aleph_n$ for n > 0.
- $C_i(\alpha)$ is the closure of $\Omega_i$ under addition and the $\psi_\eta(\mu)$ function itself (the latter of which only for $\mu < \alpha$ and $\eta \leq \omega$).
- $\psi_i(\alpha)$ is the smallest ordinal not in $C_i(\alpha)$.
- Thus, ψ_{0}(Ω_{ω}) is the smallest ordinal not in the closure of $1$ under addition and the $\psi_\eta(\mu)$ function itself (the latter of which only for $\mu < \Omega_\omega$ and $\eta \leq \omega$).
