= Bachmann–Howard ordinal =

Large countable ordinal

In mathematics, the Bachmann–Howard ordinal (also known as the Howard ordinal, or Howard–Bachmann ordinal) is a large countable ordinal. It is the proof-theoretic ordinal of several mathematical theories, such as Kripke–Platek set theory (with the axiom of infinity) and the system CZF of constructive set theory. It was introduced by Heinz Bachmann (1950) and William Alvin Howard (1972).

== Definition ==
The Bachmann–Howard ordinal is defined using an ordinal collapsing function:

- ε_{α} enumerates the epsilon numbers, the ordinals ε such that ω^{ε} = ε.
- Ω = ω_{1} is the first uncountable ordinal.
- ε_{Ω+1} is the first epsilon number after Ω = ε_{Ω}.
- ψ(α) is defined to be the smallest ordinal that cannot be constructed by starting with 0, 1, ω and Ω, and repeatedly applying ordinal addition, multiplication and exponentiation, and ψ to previously constructed ordinals (except that ψ can only be applied to arguments less than α, to ensure that it is well defined).
- The Bachmann–Howard ordinal is ψ(ε_{Ω+1}).

The Bachmann–Howard ordinal can also be defined as φ_{ε_{Ω+1}}(0) for an extension of the Veblen functions φ_{α} to certain functions α of ordinals; this extension was carried out by Heinz Bachmann and is not completely straightforward.
