= Elementary function arithmetic =

System of arithmetic in proof theory

In proof theory, a branch of mathematical logic, elementary function arithmetic (EFA), also called elementary arithmetic and exponential function arithmetic, is the system of arithmetic with the usual elementary properties of 0, 1, +, ×, $x^y$, together with induction for formulas with bounded quantifiers.

EFA is a very weak logical system, whose proof-theoretic ordinal is $\omega^3$, but still seems able to prove much of ordinary mathematics that can be stated in the language of first-order arithmetic.

== Definition ==
EFA is a system in first-order logic (with equality). Its language contains:

- two constants $0$, $1$,
- three binary operations $+$, $\times$, $\textrm{exp}$, with $\textrm{exp}(x,y)$ usually written as $x^y$,
- a binary relation symbol $<$ (This is not really necessary as it can be written in terms of the other operations and is sometimes omitted, but is convenient for defining bounded quantifiers).

Bounded quantifiers are those of the form $\forall(x < y)$ and $\exists(x < y)$ which are abbreviations for $\forall x(x < y)\rightarrow\ldots$ and $\exists x(x < y)\land\ldots$ in the usual way.

The axioms of EFA are

- The axioms of Robinson arithmetic for $0$, $1$, $+$, $\times$, $<$
- The axioms for exponentiation: $x^0=1$, $x^{y+1}=x^y\times x$.
- Induction for formulas all of whose quantifiers are bounded (but which may contain free variables).

== Friedman's grand conjecture ==
Harvey Friedman's grand conjecture implies that many mathematical theorems, such as Fermat's Last Theorem, can be proved in very weak systems such as EFA.

The original statement of the conjecture from Friedman (1999) is:

"Every theorem published in the Annals of Mathematics whose statement involves only finitary mathematical objects (i.e., what logicians call an arithmetical statement) can be proved in EFA. EFA is the weak fragment of Peano Arithmetic based on the usual quantifier-free axioms for 0, 1, +, ×, exp, together with the scheme of induction for all formulas in the language all of whose quantifiers are bounded."

While it is easy to construct artificial arithmetical statements that are true but not provable in EFA, the point of Friedman's conjecture is that natural examples of such statements in mathematics seem to be rare. Some natural examples include consistency statements from logic, several statements related to Ramsey theory, and other theorems from graph theory such as the Szemerédi regularity lemma, and the graph minor theorem.

== Related systems ==
Several related computational complexity classes have similar properties to EFA:

- One can omit the binary function symbol exp from the language, by taking Robinson arithmetic together with induction for all formulas with bounded quantifiers and an axiom stating roughly that exponentiation is a function defined everywhere. This is similar to EFA and has the same proof-theoretic strength, but is more cumbersome to work with.
- There are weak fragments of second-order arithmetic called $\mathsf{RCA}_0^*$ and $\mathsf{WKL}_0^*$ that are conservative over EFA for $\Pi_2^0$ sentences (i.e. any $\Pi_2^0$ sentences proven by $\mathsf{RCA}_0^*$ or $\mathsf{WKL}_0^*$ are already proven by EFA.) In particular, they are conservative for consistency statements. These fragments are sometimes studied in reverse mathematics (Simpson 2009).
- Elementary recursive arithmetic (ERA) is a subsystem of primitive recursive arithmetic (PRA) in which recursion is restricted to bounded sums and products. This also has the same $\Pi_2^0$ sentences as EFA, in the sense that whenever EFA proves ∀x∃y P(x,y), with P quantifier-free, ERA proves the open formula P(x,T(x)), with T a term definable in ERA. Like PRA, ERA can be defined in an entirely logic-free manner, with just the rules of substitution and induction, and defining equations for all elementary recursive functions. Unlike PRA, however, the elementary recursive functions can be characterized by the closure under composition and projection of a finite number of basis functions, and thus only a finite number of defining equations are needed.

== See also ==
- Elementary function – Type of mathematical function
- Grzegorczyk hierarchy – Functions in computability theory
- Reverse mathematics – Branch of mathematical logic
- Ordinal analysis – Mathematical technique used in proof theory
- Tarski's high school algebra problem – Mathematical problem
