= Gentzen's consistency proof =

Mathematical logic concept

Gentzen's consistency proof is a result of proof theory in mathematical logic, published by Gerhard Gentzen in 1936. It shows that the Peano axioms of first-order arithmetic do not contain a contradiction (i.e. are "consistent"), as long as a certain other system used in the proof does not contain any contradictions either. This other system, today called "primitive recursive arithmetic with the additional principle of quantifier-free transfinite induction up to the ordinal ε_{0}", is neither weaker nor stronger than the system of Peano axioms. Gentzen argued that it avoids the questionable modes of inference contained in Peano arithmetic and that its consistency is therefore less controversial.

== Gentzen's theorem ==
Gentzen's theorem is concerned with first-order arithmetic: the theory of the natural numbers, including their addition and multiplication, axiomatized by the first-order Peano axioms. This is a "first-order" theory: the quantifiers extend over natural numbers, but not over sets or functions of natural numbers. The theory is strong enough to describe recursively defined integer functions such as exponentiation, factorials or the Fibonacci sequence.

Gentzen showed that the consistency of the first-order Peano axioms is provable over the base theory of primitive recursive arithmetic with the additional principle of quantifier-free transfinite induction up to the ordinal ε_{0}. Primitive recursive arithmetic is a much simplified form of arithmetic that is rather uncontroversial. The additional principle means, informally, that there is a well-ordering on the set of finite rooted trees. Formally, ε_{0} is the first ordinal $\alpha$ such that $\omega^\alpha = \alpha$, i.e. the limit of the sequence

$$\omega,\ \omega^\omega,\ \omega^{\omega^\omega},\ \ldots$$

It is a countable ordinal much smaller than large countable ordinals. To express ordinals in the language of arithmetic, an ordinal notation is needed, i.e. a way to assign natural numbers to ordinals less than ε_{0}. This can be done in various ways, one example provided by Cantor's normal form theorem. Gentzen's proof is based on the following assumption: for any quantifier-free formula A(x), if there is an ordinal a< ε_{0} for which A(a) is false, then there is a least such ordinal.

Gentzen defines a notion of "reduction procedure" for proofs in Peano arithmetic. For a given proof, such a procedure produces a tree of proofs, with the given one serving as the root of the tree, and the other proofs being, in a sense, "simpler" than the given one. This increasing simplicity is formalized by attaching an ordinal < ε_{0} to every proof, and showing that, as one moves down the tree, these ordinals get smaller with every step. He then shows that if there were a proof of a contradiction, the reduction procedure would result in an infinite strictly descending sequence of ordinals smaller than ε_{0} produced by a primitive recursive operation on proofs corresponding to a quantifier-free formula.

== Relation to Hilbert's program and Gödel's theorem ==
Gentzen's proof highlights one commonly missed aspect of Gödel's second incompleteness theorem. It is sometimes claimed that the consistency of a theory can only be proved in a stronger theory. Gentzen's theory obtained by adding quantifier-free transfinite induction to primitive recursive arithmetic proves the consistency of first-order Peano arithmetic (PA) but does not contain PA. For example, it does not prove ordinary mathematical induction for all formulae, whereas PA does (since all instances of induction are axioms of PA). Gentzen's theory is not contained in PA, either, however, since it can prove a number-theoretical fact—the consistency of PA—that PA cannot. Therefore, the two theories are, in one sense, incomparable.

That said, there are other, finer ways to compare the strength of theories, the most important of which is defined in terms of the notion of interpretability. It can be shown that, if one theory T is interpretable in another B, then T is consistent if B is. (Indeed, this is a large point of the notion of interpretability.) And, assuming that T is not extremely weak, T itself will be able to prove this very conditional: If B is consistent, then so is T. Hence, T cannot prove that B is consistent, by the second incompleteness theorem, whereas B may well be able to prove that T is consistent. This is what motivates the idea of using interpretability to compare theories, i.e., the thought that, if B interprets T, then B is at least as strong (in the sense of 'consistency strength') as T is.

A strong form of the second incompleteness theorem, proved by Pavel Pudlák, who was building on earlier work by Solomon Feferman, states that no consistent theory T that contains Robinson arithmetic, Q, can interpret Q plus Con(T), the statement that T is consistent. By contrast, Q+Con(T) does interpret T, by a strong form of the arithmetized completeness theorem. So Q+Con(T) is always stronger (in one good sense) than T is. But Gentzen's theory trivially interprets Q+Con(PA), since it contains Q and proves Con(PA), and so Gentzen's theory interprets PA. But, by Pudlák's result, PA cannot interpret Gentzen's theory, since Gentzen's theory (as just said) interprets Q+Con(PA), and interpretability is transitive. That is: If PA did interpret Gentzen's theory, then it would also interpret Q+Con(PA) and so would be inconsistent, by Pudlák's result. So, in the sense of consistency strength, as characterized by interpretability, Gentzen's theory is stronger than Peano arithmetic.

Hermann Weyl made the following comment in 1946 regarding the significance of Gentzen's consistency result following the devastating impact of Gödel's 1931 incompleteness result on Hilbert's plan to prove the consistency of mathematics.

It is likely that all mathematicians ultimately would have accepted Hilbert's approach had he been able to carry it out successfully. The first steps were inspiring and promising. But then Gödel dealt it a terrific blow (1931), from which it has not yet recovered. Gödel enumerated the symbols, formulas, and sequences of formulas in Hilbert's formalism in a certain way, and thus transformed the assertion of consistency into an arithmetic proposition. He could show that this proposition can neither be proved nor disproved within the formalism. This can mean only two things: either the reasoning by which a proof of consistency is given must contain some argument that has no formal counterpart within the system, i.e., we have not succeeded in completely formalizing the procedure of mathematical induction; or hope for a strictly "finitistic" proof of consistency must be given up altogether. When G. Gentzen finally succeeded in proving the consistency of arithmetic he trespassed those limits indeed by claiming as evident a type of reasoning that penetrates into Cantor's "second class of ordinal numbers."

Kleene made the following comment in 1952 on the significance of Gentzen's result, particularly in the context of the formalist program which was initiated by Hilbert:

The original proposals of the formalists to make classical mathematics secure by a consistency proof did not contemplate that such a method as transfinite induction up to ε_{0} would have to be used. To what extent the Gentzen proof can be accepted as securing classical number theory in the sense of that problem formulation is in the present state of affairs a matter for individual judgement, depending on how ready one is to accept induction up to ε_{0} as a finitary method.

In contrast, Bernays commented on whether Hilbert's confinement to finitary methods was too restrictive:

It thus became apparent that the 'finite Standpunkt' is not the only alternative to classical ways of reasoning and is not necessarily implied by the idea of proof theory. An enlarging of the methods of proof theory was therefore suggested: instead of a reduction to finitist methods of reasoning, it was required only that the arguments be of a constructive character, allowing us to deal with more general forms of inference.

== Other consistency proofs of arithmetic ==
Gentzen's first version of his consistency proof was not published during his lifetime because Bernays had objected to a method implicitly used in the proof. The modified proof, described above, was published in 1936. Gentzen went on to publish two more consistency proofs, one in 1938 and one in 1943. All of these are contained in his collected papers.

Kurt Gödel reinterpreted Gentzen's 1936 proof in a lecture in 1938 in what came to be known as the no-counterexample interpretation. Both the original proof and the reformulation can be understood in game-theoretic terms.

In 1940, Wilhelm Ackermann published another consistency proof for Peano arithmetic, also using the ordinal ε_{0}.

Another proof of consistency of Arithmetic was published by I. N. Khlodovskii, in 1959.

== Work initiated by Gentzen's proof ==
Gentzen's proof is the first example of what is called proof-theoretic ordinal analysis. In ordinal analysis one gauges the strength of theories by measuring how large the (constructive) ordinals are that can be proven to be well-ordered, or equivalently for how large a (constructive) ordinal can transfinite induction be proven. A constructive ordinal is the order type of a recursive well-ordering of natural numbers.

In this language, Gentzen's work establishes that the proof-theoretic ordinal of first-order Peano arithmetic is ε_{0}.

Laurence Kirby and Jeff Paris proved in 1982 that Goodstein's theorem cannot be proven in Peano arithmetic. Their proof was based on Gentzen's theorem.
