= Buchholz Manor =

Manor house in Alfter, Germany

- Herrenhaus Buchholz (German)
- Buchholz in 2018
- Interactive map of Buchholz Manor
- 50°44′36″N 6°59′44″E
- Location: Buchholzweg 1, 53347; Alfter, Germany

History
- Built: 1858

Site notes
- Website: herrenhaus-buchholz.de

Buchholz Manor (German: Herrenhaus Buchholz) is manor house and event venue in Alfter, Germany. Mathias Thomé used to run the Buccholz Forest Restaurant on the site.

== See also ==
- Schloss Buchholz
- Schlössli Buchholz
