= Schloss Buchholz =

Mansion in Germany

Buchholz Castle
- Schloss Buchholz (German)
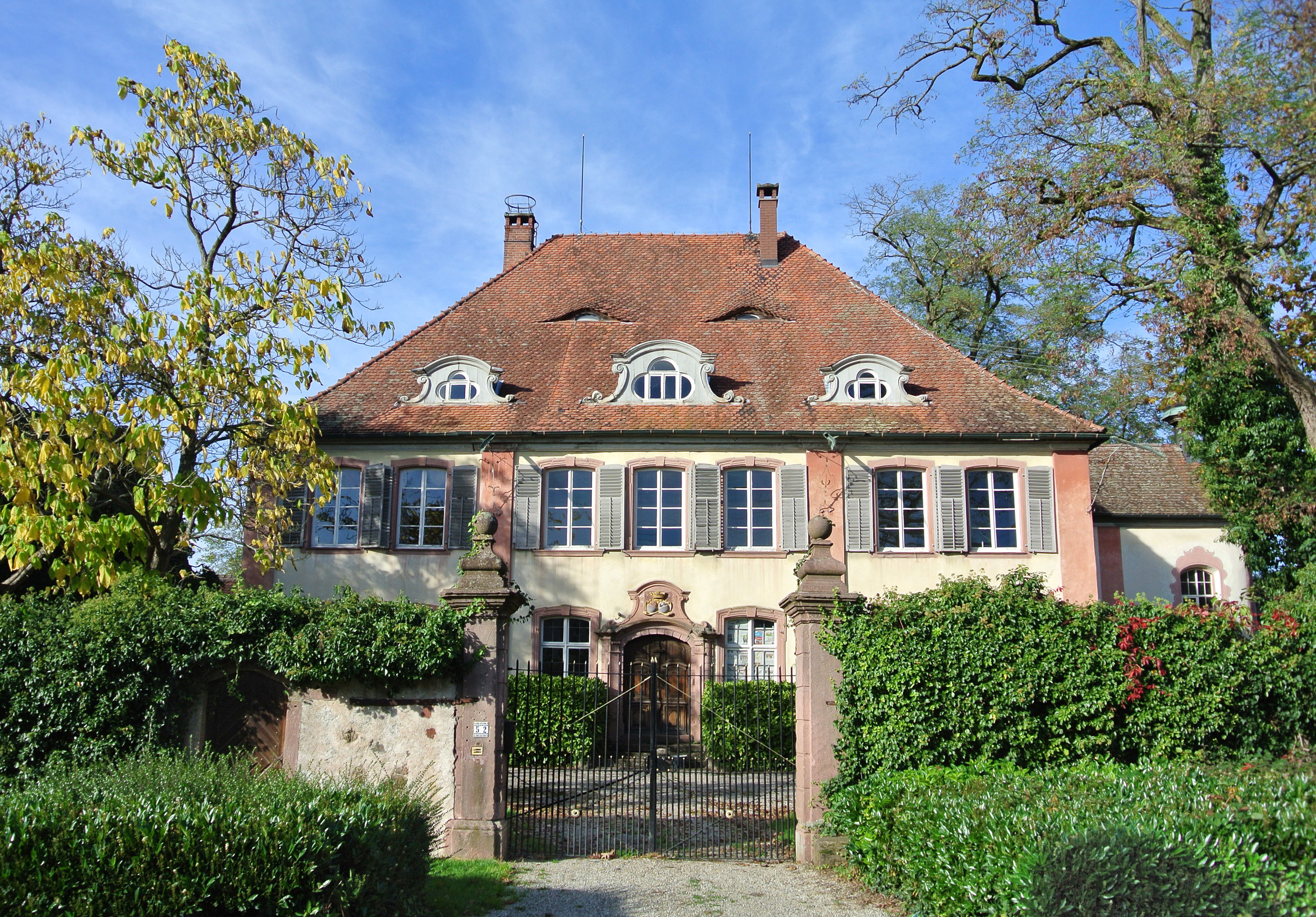
- Schloss Buechholz in 2014
- Interactive map of Buchholz Castle
- 48°04′51″N 7°54′53″E
- Location: Schwarzwaldstraße 52; Waldkirch, Germany

History
- Built: 1760

Site notes
- Architectural style: Baroque

Schloss Buchholz is a Baroque palace in Waldkirch, Germany.

== History ==
The castle was built in 1760. It housed a school.

== See also ==
- Buchholz Manor
