= Theories of iterated inductive definitions =

In set theory and logic, Buchholz's ID hierarchy is a hierarchy of subsystems of first-order arithmetic. The systems/theories $\mathsf{ID}_\nu$ are referred to as "the formal theories of ν-times iterated inductive definitions". ID_{ν} extends PA by ν iterated least fixed points of monotone operators.

== Definition ==
=== Original definition ===
The formal theory ID_{ω} (and ID_{ν} in general) is an extension of Peano Arithmetic, formulated in the language L_{ID}, by the following axioms:

- $\forall y \forall x (\mathfrak{M}_y(P^\mathfrak{M}_y, x) \rightarrow x \in P^\mathfrak{M}_y)$
- $\forall y (\forall x (\mathfrak{M}_y(F, x) \rightarrow F(x)) \rightarrow \forall x (x \in P^\mathfrak{M}_y \rightarrow F(x)))$ for every L_{ID}-formula F(x)
- $\forall y \forall x_0 \forall x_1(P^\mathfrak{M}_{<y}x_0x_1 \leftrightarrow x_0 < y \land x_1 \in P^\mathfrak{M}_{x_0})$

The theory ID_{ν} with ν ≠ ω is defined as:

- $\forall y \forall x (Z_y(P^\mathfrak{M}_y, x) \rightarrow x \in P^\mathfrak{M}_y)$
- $\forall x (\mathfrak{M}_u(F, x) \rightarrow F(x)) \rightarrow \forall x (P^\mathfrak{M}_ux \rightarrow F(x))$ for every L_{ID}-formula F(x) and each u < ν
- $\forall y \forall x_0 \forall x_1(P^\mathfrak{M}_{<y}x_0x_1 \leftrightarrow x_0 < y \land x_1 \in P^\mathfrak{M}_{x_0})$

=== Explanation / alternate definition ===
==== ID_{1} ====
A set $I \subseteq \N$ is called inductively defined if for some monotonic operator $\Gamma: P(N) \rightarrow P(N)$, $LFP(\Gamma) = I$, where $LFP(f)$ denotes the least fixed point of $f$. The language of ID_{1}, $L_{ID_1}$, is obtained from that of first-order number theory, $L_\N$, by the addition of a set (or predicate) constant I_{A} for every X-positive formula A(X, x) in L_{N}[X] that only contains X (a new set variable) and x (a number variable) as free variables. The term X-positive means that X only occurs positively in A (X is never on the left of an implication). We allow ourselves a bit of set-theoretic notation:

- $F = \{x \in N \mid F(x)\}$
- $s \in F$ means $F(s)$
- For two formulas $F$ and $G$, $F \subseteq G$ means $\forall x F(x) \rightarrow G(x)$.

Then ID_{1} contains the axioms of first-order number theory (PA) with the induction scheme extended to the new language as well as these axioms:

- $(ID_1)^1: A(I_A) \subseteq I_A$
- $(ID_1)^2: A(F) \subseteq F \rightarrow I_A \subseteq F$

Where $F(x)$ ranges over all $L_{ID_1}$ formulas.

Note that $(ID_1)^1$ expresses that $I_A$ is closed under the arithmetically definable set operator $\Gamma_A(S) = \{x \in \N \mid \N \models A(S, x)\}$, while $(ID_1)^2$ expresses that $I_A$ is the least such (at least among sets definable in $L_{ID_1}$).

Thus, $I_A$ is meant to be the least pre-fixed-point, and hence the least fixed point of the operator $\Gamma_A$.

==== ID_{ν} ====
To define the system of ν-times iterated inductive definitions, where ν is an ordinal, let $\prec$ be a primitive recursive well-ordering of order type ν. We use Greek letters to denote elements of the field of $\prec$. The language of ID_{ν}, $L_{ID_\nu}$ is obtained from $L_\N$ by the addition of a binary predicate constant J_{A} for every X-positive $L_\N[X, Y]$ formula $A(X, Y, \mu, x)$ that contains at most the shown free variables, where X is again a unary (set) variable, and Y is a fresh binary predicate variable. We write $x \in J^\mu_A$ instead of $J_A(\mu, x)$, thinking of x as a distinguished variable in the latter formula.

The system ID_{ν} is now obtained from the system of first-order number theory (PA) by expanding the induction scheme to the new language and adding the scheme $(TI_\nu): TI(\prec, F)$ expressing transfinite induction along $\prec$ for an arbitrary $L_{ID_\nu}$ formula $F$ as well as the axioms:

- $(ID_\nu)^1: \forall \mu \prec \nu; A^\mu(J^\mu_A) \subseteq J^\mu_A$
- $(ID_\nu)^2: \forall \mu \prec \nu; A^\mu(F) \subseteq F \rightarrow J^\mu_A \subseteq F$

where $F(x)$ is an arbitrary $L_{ID_\nu}$ formula. In $(ID_\nu)^1$ and $(ID_\nu)^2$ we used the abbreviation $A^\mu(F)$ for the formula $A(F, (\lambda\gamma y; \gamma \prec \mu \land y \in J^\gamma_A), \mu, x)$, where $x$ is the distinguished variable. We see that these express that each $J^\mu_A$, for $\mu \prec \nu$, is the least fixed point (among definable sets) for the operator $\Gamma^\mu_A(S) = \{n \in \N | (\N, (J^\gamma_A)_{\gamma \prec \mu}\}$. Note how all the previous sets $J^\gamma_A$, for $\gamma \prec \mu$, are used as parameters.

We then define $ID_{\prec \nu} = \bigcup _{\xi \prec \nu}ID_\xi$.

==== Variants ====
$\widehat{\mathsf{ID}}_\nu$ - $\widehat{\mathsf{ID}}_\nu$ is a weakened version of $\mathsf{ID}_\nu$. In the system of $\widehat{\mathsf{ID}}_\nu$, a set $I \subseteq \N$ is instead called inductively defined if for some monotonic operator $\Gamma: P(N) \rightarrow P(N)$, $I$ is a fixed point of $\Gamma$, rather than the least fixed point. This subtle difference makes the system significantly weaker: $PTO(\widehat{\mathsf{ID}}_1) = \psi(\Omega^{\varepsilon_0})$, while $PTO(\mathsf{ID}_1) = \psi(\varepsilon_{\Omega+1})$.

$\mathsf{ID}_\nu\#$ is $\widehat{\mathsf{ID}}_\nu$ weakened even further. In $\mathsf{ID}_\nu\#$, not only does it use fixed points rather than least fixed points, and has induction only for positive formulas. This once again subtle difference makes the system even weaker: $PTO(\mathsf{ID}_1\#) = \psi(\Omega^\omega)$, while $PTO(\widehat{\mathsf{ID}}_1) = \psi(\Omega^{\varepsilon_0})$.

$\mathsf{W-ID}_\nu$ is the weakest of all variants of $\mathsf{ID}_\nu$, based on W-types. The amount of weakening compared to regular iterated inductive definitions is identical to removing bar induction given a certain subsystem of second-order arithmetic. $PTO(\mathsf{W-ID}_1) = \psi_0(\Omega\times\omega)$, while $PTO(\mathsf{ID}_1) = \psi(\varepsilon_{\Omega+1})$.

$\mathsf{U(ID}_\nu\mathsf{)}$ is an "unfolding" strengthening of $\mathsf{ID}_\nu$. It is not exactly a first-order arithmetic system, but captures what one can get by predicative reasoning based on ν-times iterated generalized inductive definitions. The amount of increase in strength is identical to the increase from $\varepsilon_0$ to $\Gamma_0$: $PTO(\mathsf{ID}_1) = \psi(\varepsilon_{\Omega+1})$, while $PTO(\mathsf{U(ID}_1\mathsf{)}) = \psi(\Gamma_{\Omega+1})$.

== Results ==
- Let ν > 0. If a ∈ T_{0} contains no symbol D_{μ} with ν < μ, then "a ∈ W_{0}" is provable in ID_{ν}.
- ID_{ω} is contained in $\Pi^1_1 - CA + BI$.
- If a $\Pi^0_2$-sentence $\forall x \exists y \varphi(x, y) (\varphi \in \Sigma^0_1)$ is provable in ID_{ν}, then there exists $p \in N$ such that $\forall n \geq p \exists k < H_{D_0D^n_\nu0}(1) \varphi(n, k)$.
- If the sentence A is provable in ID_{ν} for all ν < ω, then there exists k ∈ N such that $\vdash_k^{D^k_\nu0} A^N$.

== Proof-theoretic ordinals ==
- The proof-theoretic ordinal of ID_{<ν} is equal to $\psi_0(\Omega_\nu)$.
- The proof-theoretic ordinal of ID_{ν} is equal to $\psi_0(\varepsilon_{\Omega_\nu+1}) = \psi_0(\Omega_{\nu+1})$ .
- The proof-theoretic ordinal of $\widehat{ID}_{<\omega}$ is equal to $\Gamma_0$.
- The proof-theoretic ordinal of $\widehat{ID}_\nu$ for $\nu < \omega$ is equal to $\varphi(\varphi(\nu, 0), 0)$.
- The proof-theoretic ordinal of $\widehat{ID}_{\varphi(\alpha, \beta)}$ is equal to $\varphi(1, 0, \varphi(\alpha+1, \beta-1))$.
- The proof-theoretic ordinal of $\widehat{ID}_{<\varphi(0, \alpha)}$ for $\alpha > 1$ is equal to $\varphi(1, \alpha, 0)$.
- The proof-theoretic ordinal of $\widehat{ID}_{<\nu}$ for $\nu \geq \varepsilon_0$ is equal to $\varphi(1, \nu, 0)$.
- The proof-theoretic ordinal of $ID_\nu\#$ is equal to $\varphi(\omega^\nu, 0)$.
- The proof-theoretic ordinal of $ID_{<\nu}\#$ is equal to $\varphi(0, \omega^{\nu+1})$.
- The proof-theoretic ordinal of $W\textrm{-}ID_{\varphi(\alpha, \beta)}$ is equal to $\psi_0(\Omega_{\varphi(\alpha, \beta)}\times\varphi(\alpha+1, \beta-1))$.
- The proof-theoretic ordinal of $W\textrm{-}ID_{<\varphi(\alpha, \beta)}$ is equal to $\psi_0(\varphi(\alpha+1, \beta-1)^{\Omega_{\varphi(\alpha, \beta-1)}+1})$.
- The proof-theoretic ordinal of $U(ID_\nu)$ is equal to $\psi_0(\varphi(\nu, 0, \Omega+1))$.
- The proof-theoretic ordinal of $U(ID_{<\nu})$ is equal to $\psi_0(\Omega^{\Omega+\varphi(\nu, 0, \Omega)})$.
- The proof-theoretic ordinal of ID_{1} (the Bachmann-Howard ordinal) is also the proof-theoretic ordinal of $\mathsf{KP}$, $\mathsf{KP\omega}$, $\mathsf{CZF}$ and $\mathsf{ML_{1}V}$.
- The proof-theoretic ordinal of W-ID_{ω} ($\psi_0(\Omega_\omega\varepsilon_0)$) is also the proof-theoretic ordinal of $\mathsf{W-KPI}$.
- The proof-theoretic ordinal of ID_{ω} (the Takeuti-Feferman-Buchholz ordinal) is also the proof-theoretic ordinal of $\mathsf{KPI}$, $\Pi^1_1 - \mathsf{CA} + \mathsf{BI}$ and $\Delta^1_2 - \mathsf{CA} + \mathsf{BI}$.
- The proof-theoretic ordinal of ID_{<ω^ω} ($\psi_0(\Omega_{\omega^\omega})$) is also the proof-theoretic ordinal of $\Delta^1_2 - \mathsf{CR}$.
- The proof-theoretic ordinal of ID_{<ε0} ($\psi_0(\Omega_{\varepsilon_0})$) is also the proof-theoretic ordinal of $\Delta^1_2 - \mathsf{CA}$ and $\Sigma^1_2 - \mathsf{AC}$.
