= László Kalmár =

Hungarian mathematician (1905–1976)

Portrait of László Kalmár

László Kalmár (Hungarian: Kalmár László [ˈkɒlmaːr ˈlaːsloː]; 27 March 1905, Edde – 2 August 1976, Mátraháza) was a Hungarian mathematician and Professor at the University of Szeged. Kalmár is considered the founder of mathematical logic and theoretical computer science in Hungary.

== Biography ==
Kalmár was of Jewish ancestry. His early life mixed promise and tragedy. His father died when he was young, and his mother died when he was 17, the year he entered the University of Budapest, making him essentially an orphan.

Kalmár's brilliance manifested itself while in Budapest schools. At the University of Budapest, his teachers included Kürschák and Fejér. His fellow students included the future logician Rózsa Politzer, from 1934 on Rózsa Péter. Kalmár graduated in 1927. He discovered mathematical logic, his chosen field, while visiting Göttingen in 1929.

Upon completing his doctorate at Budapest, he took up a position at the University of Szeged. That university was mostly made up of staff from the former University of Kolozsvár, a major Hungarian university before World War I that found itself after the War in Romania. Kolozsvár was renamed Cluj. The Hungarian university moved to Szeged in 1920, where there had previously been no university. The appointment of Haar and Riesz turned Szeged into a major research center for mathematics. Kalmár began his career as a research assistant to Haar and Riesz. Kalmár was appointed a full professor at Szeged in 1947. He was the inaugural holder of Szeged's chair for the Foundations of Mathematics and Computer Science. He also founded Szeged's Cybernetic Laboratory and the Research Group for Mathematical Logic and Automata Theory.

In mathematical logic, Kalmár proved that certain classes of formulas of the first-order predicate calculus were decidable. In 1936, he proved that the predicate calculus could be formulated using a single binary predicate, if the recursive definition of a term was sufficiently rich. (This result is commonly attributed to a 1954 paper of Quine's.) He discovered an alternative form of primitive recursive arithmetic, known as elementary recursive arithmetic, based on primitive functions that differ from the usual kind. He did his utmost to promote computers and computer science in Hungary. He wrote on theoretical computer science, including programming languages, automatic error correction, non-numerical applications of computers, and the connection between computer science and mathematical logic.

Kalmár is one of the very few logicians who has raised doubts about Church's thesis that all intuitively mechanistic, algorithmic functions are representable by recursive functions.

Kalmár was elected to the Hungarian Academy of Sciences in 1949, and was awarded the Kossuth Prize in 1950 and the Hungarian State Prize in 1975.

In 1933, Kalmár married Erzsébet Arvay; they had four children.

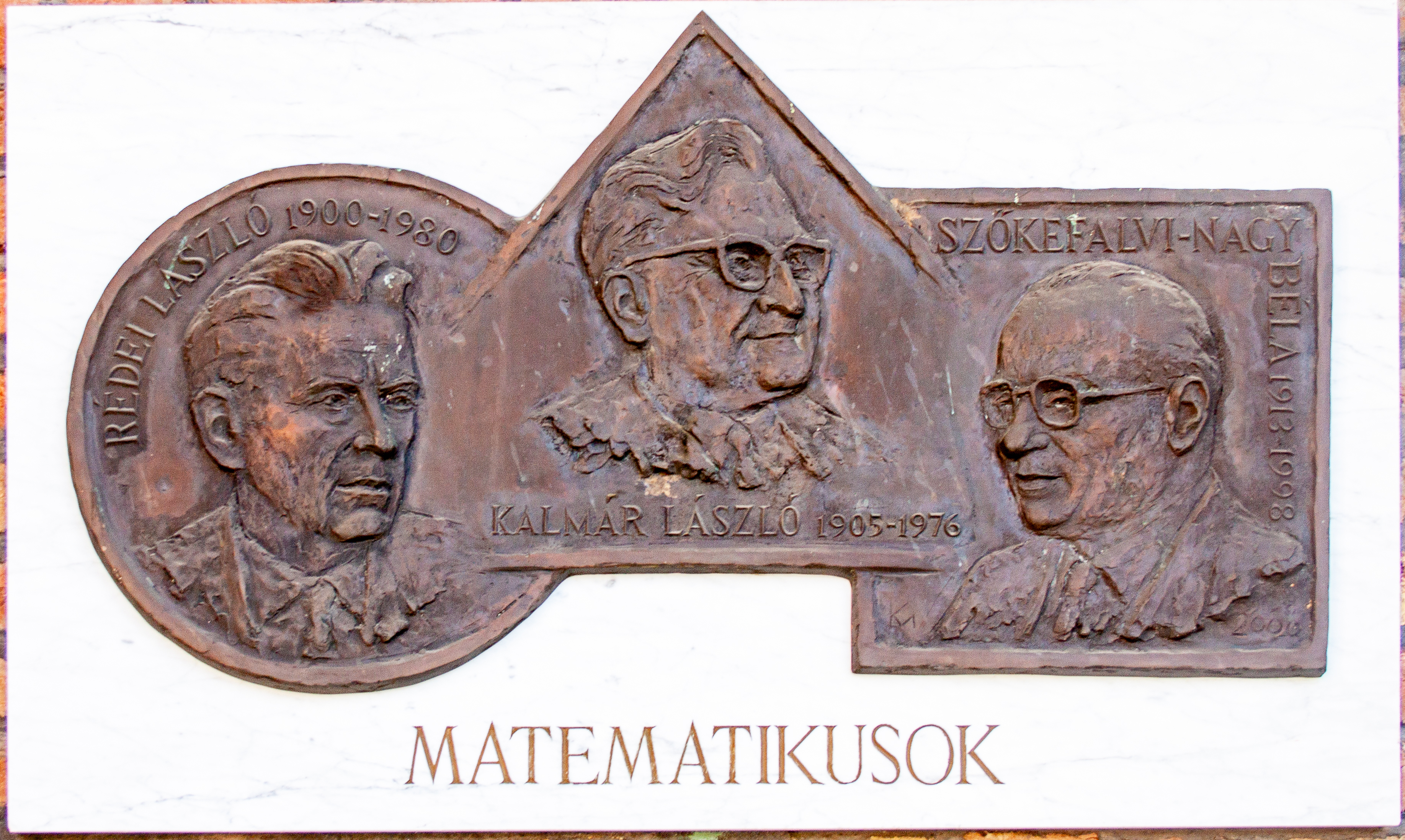
The face on the middle medallion is Kalmár's

== Elementary functions ==
Kalmár defined what are known as elementary recursive functions (i.e. those based on the natural numbers) built up from the notions of composition and variables, the constants $0$ and $1$, repeated addition $+$ of the constants, proper subtraction $\mathbin{\dot{-}}$, bounded summation and bounded product. Elimination of the bounded product from this list yields the subelementary or lower elementary functions. By use of the abstract computational model called a register machine, Schwichtenberg provides a demonstration that "all elementary functions are computable and totally defined".
