= FGH =

FGH may refer to:

- Fishguard Harbour railway station, in Wales
- The Fort Garry Horse, a Canadian Army Reserve armoured regiment
- Furness General Hospital, in Barrow-in-Furness, England
- Fast-growing hierarchy, a method to describe fast-growing functions.
