= Fundamental sequence =

The mathematical term fundamental sequence can refer to:

- In analysis, Cauchy sequence.
- In discrete mathematics and computer science, Unary coding.
- In set theory, a fundamental sequence for an ordinal is a sequence of ordinals approaching the limit ordinal from below.
