= Hardy hierarchy =

In computability theory, computational complexity theory and proof theory, the Hardy hierarchy, named after G. H. Hardy, is a hierarchy of sets of numerical functions generated from an ordinal-indexed family of functions h_{α}: N → N (where N is the set of natural numbers, {0, 1, ...}) called Hardy functions. It is related to the fast-growing hierarchy and slow-growing hierarchy.

The Hardy hierarchy was introduced by Stanley S. Wainer in 1972, but the idea of its definition comes from Hardy's 1904 paper, in which Hardy exhibits a set of reals with cardinality $\aleph_1$.

== Definition ==
Let μ be a large countable ordinal such that a fundamental sequence is assigned to every limit ordinal less than μ. The Hardy functions h_{α}: N → N, for α < μ, is then defined as follows:

- $H_0(n) = n,$
- $H_{\alpha+1}(n) = H_\alpha(n + 1),$
- $H_{\alpha}(n) = H_{\alpha[n]}(n)$ if α is a limit ordinal.

Here α[n] denotes the n^{th} element of the fundamental sequence assigned to the limit ordinal α. A standardized choice of fundamental sequence for all α ≤ ε_{0} is described in the article on the fast-growing hierarchy.

The Hardy hierarchy $\{\mathcal{H}_\alpha\}_{\alpha<\mu}$ is a family of numerical functions. For each ordinal α, a set $\mathcal{H}_\alpha$ is defined as the smallest class of functions containing H_{α}, zero, successor and projection functions, and closed under limited primitive recursion and limited substitution (similar to Grzegorczyk hierarchy).

Caicedo (2007) defines a modified Hardy hierarchy of functions $H_\alpha$ by using the standard fundamental sequences, but with α[n+1] (instead of α[n]) in the third line of the above definition.

== Relation to fast-growing hierarchy ==
The Wainer hierarchy of functions f_{α} and the Hardy hierarchy of functions H_{α} are related by f_{α} = H_{ω^{α}} for all α < ε_{0}. Thus, for any α < ε_{0}, H_{α} grows much more slowly than does f_{α}. However, the Hardy hierarchy "catches up" to the Wainer hierarchy at α = ε_{0}, such that f_{ε_{0}} and H_{ε_{0}} have the same growth rate, in the sense that f_{ε_{0}}(n-1) ≤ H_{ε_{0}}(n) ≤ f_{ε_{0}}(n+1) for all n ≥ 1. (Gallier 1991)
