= Reuben Goodstein =

English mathematician (1912–1985)

- Born: Reuben Louis Goodstein; 15 December 1912; London, England
- Died: 8 March 1985 (aged 72); Leicester, England
- Education: Magdalene College, Cambridge (MA); Birkbeck, University of London (PhD)
- Known for: Goodstein's theorem Primitive recursive arithmetic
- Scientific career
- Institutions: University of Leicester; University of Cambridge
- Thesis: An axiom-free equation calculus (1946)
- Doctoral advisor: Ludwig Wittgenstein
- Doctoral students: Alan Bundy; S. Barry Cooper; Martin Löb

Reuben Louis Goodstein (15 December 1912 – 8 March 1985) was an English mathematician with an interest in the philosophy and teaching of mathematics.

== Education ==
Goodstein was educated at St Paul's School, London. He received his Master's degree from Magdalene College, Cambridge. After this, he worked at the University of Reading but ultimately spent most of his academic career at the University of Leicester. He earned his PhD from the University of London in 1946 while still working in Reading.

Goodstein also studied under Ludwig Wittgenstein. Wittgenstein selected Goodstein and others to take notes of his lectures, the collection of which later became The Blue Book.

== Research ==
He published many works on finitism and the reconstruction of analysis from a finitistic viewpoint, for example "Constructive Formalism. Essays on the foundations of mathematics." Goodstein's theorem was among the earliest examples of theorems found to be unprovable in Peano arithmetic but provable in stronger logical systems (such as second-order arithmetic). He also introduced a variant of the Ackermann function that is now known as the hyperoperation sequence, together with the naming convention now used for these operations (tetration, pentation, etc.).

Besides mathematical logic (in which he held the first professorial chair in the U.K.), mathematical analysis, and the philosophy of mathematics, Goodstein was keenly interested in the teaching of mathematics. From 1956 to 1962 he was editor of The Mathematical Gazette. In 1962 he was an invited speaker at the International Congress of Mathematicians (with an address on A recursive lattice) in Stockholm. Among his doctoral students are Martin Löb and Alan Bundy.

== Publications ==
- Fundamental concepts of mathematics, Pergamon Press, 1962, 2nd edn. 1979
- Essays in the philosophy of mathematics, Leicester University Press 1965
- Recursive Analysis, North Holland 1961, Dover 2010
- Mathematical Logic, Leicester University Press 1957
- Development of mathematical logic, London, Logos Press 1971
- Complex functions, McGraw Hill 1965
- Boolean Algebra, Pergamon Press 1963, Dover 2007
- Recursive number theory - a development of recursive arithmetic in a logic-free equation calculus, North Holland 1957
- Constructive formalism - essays on the foundations of mathematics, Leicester University College 1951
- with E. J. F. Primrose: Axiomatic projective geometry, Leicester University College 1953
