= Slow-growing hierarchy =

Family of mathematical functions

In computability theory, computational complexity theory and proof theory, the slow-growing hierarchy is an ordinal-indexed family of slowly increasing functions g_{α}: N → N (where N is the set of natural numbers, {0, 1, ...}). It contrasts with the fast-growing hierarchy.

== Definition ==
Let μ be a large countable ordinal such that a fundamental sequence is assigned to every limit ordinal less than μ. The slow-growing hierarchy of functions g_{α}: N → N, for α < μ, is then defined as follows:

- $g_0(n) = 0$
- $g_{\alpha+1}(n) = g_\alpha(n) + 1$
- $g_\alpha(n) = g_{\alpha[n]}(n)$ for limit ordinal α.

Here α[n] denotes the n^{th} element of the fundamental sequence assigned to the limit ordinal α.

The article on the fast-growing hierarchy describes a standardized choice for fundamental sequence for all α < ε_{0}.

== Example ==
- $g_1(n) = 1$
- $g_m(n) = m$
- $g_\omega(n) = n$
- $g_{\omega+m}(n) = n+m$
- $g_{\omega m}(n) = mn$
- $g_{\omega^m}(n) = n^m$
- $g_{\omega^\omega}(n) = n^n$
- $g_{\varepsilon _0}(n) = n\uparrow\uparrow n$

== Relation to fast-growing hierarchy ==
The slow-growing hierarchy grows much more slowly than the fast-growing hierarchy. Even g_{ε_{0}} is only equivalent to f_{3} and g_{α} only attains the growth of f_{ε_{0}} (the first function that Peano arithmetic cannot prove total in the hierarchy) when α is the Bachmann–Howard ordinal.

However, Girard proved that the slow-growing hierarchy eventually catches up with the fast-growing one. Specifically, that there exists an ordinal α such that for all integers n

g_{α}(n) < f_{α}(n) < g_{α}(n + 1)

where f_{α} are the functions in the fast-growing hierarchy. He further showed that the first α this holds for is the ordinal of the theory ID_{<ω} of arbitrary finite iterations of an inductive definition. However, for the assignment of fundamental sequences found in the first match up occurs at the level ε_{0}. For Buchholz style tree ordinals it could be shown that the first match up even occurs at $\omega^2$.

Extensions of the result proved to considerably larger ordinals show that there are very few ordinals below the ordinal of transfinitely iterated $\Pi^1_1$-comprehension where the slow- and fast-growing hierarchy match up.

The slow-growing hierarchy depends extremely sensitively on the choice of the underlying fundamental sequences.
