= ELEMENTARY =

In computational complexity theory, the complexity class $\mathsf{ELEMENTARY}$ consists of the decision problems that can be solved in time bounded by an elementary recursive function. Equivalently, these are the problems that can be solved in time bounded by an iterated exponential function with a bounded number of iterations.

Every elementary recursive function can be computed in a time bound of this form, and therefore every decision problem whose calculation uses only elementary recursive functions belongs to the complexity class $\mathsf{ELEMENTARY}$.

The time hierarchy theorem implies that $\mathsf{ELEMENTARY}$ has no complete problems. Problems outside of $\mathsf{ELEMENTARY}$ are the nonelementary problems.

== Definition ==
The most quickly-growing elementary recursive functions are obtained by iterating an exponential function such as $2^n$ for a bounded number $k$ of iterations,
$$\left.
\begin{matrix}
2^{\scriptstyle 2^{\scriptstyle 2^{\scriptstyle \cdot^{\scriptstyle \cdot^{\scriptstyle \cdot^{\scriptstyle n}}}}}}
\end{matrix}
\right\} k\text{ times}.$$

Thus, $\mathsf{ELEMENTARY}$ is the union of the classes

$$\begin{align}
\mathsf{ELEMENTARY} & = \bigcup_{k \in \mathbb{N}} k\mathsf{\mbox{-}EXP} \\
& = \mathsf{DTIME}\left(2^n\right)\cup\mathsf{DTIME}\left(2^{2^n}\right)\cup
\mathsf{DTIME}\left(2^{2^{2^n}}\right)\cup\cdots.
\end{align}$$
It is sometimes described as iterated exponential time, though this term more commonly refers to time bounded by the tetration function.

== Characterizations ==
=== Iterated stack automata ===
This complexity class can be characterized by a certain class of "iterated stack automata", pushdown automata that can store the entire state of a lower-order iterated stack automaton in each cell of their stack. These automata can compute every language in $\mathsf{ELEMENTARY}$, and cannot compute languages beyond this complexity class.

=== Higher-order logic ===
In descriptive complexity theory, ELEMENTARY is equal to the class HO of languages that can be described by a formula of higher-order logic. This means that every language in the ELEMENTARY complexity class corresponds to as a higher-order formula that is true for, and only for, the elements on the language. More precisely, $\mathsf{NTIME}\left(2^{2^{\cdots{2^{O(n)}}}}\right) = \exists{}\mathsf{HO}^i$, where ⋯ indicates a tower of i exponentiations and $\exists{}\mathsf{HO}^i$ is the class of queries that begin with existential quantifiers of ith order and then a formula of (i − 1)th order.
