= Fast-growing hierarchy =

Ordinal-indexed family of rapidly increasing functions

In computability theory, computational complexity theory and proof theory, a fast-growing hierarchy (also called an extended Grzegorczyk hierarchy, or a Schwichtenberg–Wainer hierarchy) is an ordinal-indexed family of rapidly increasing functions f_{α}: N → N (where N is the set of natural numbers {0, 1, ...}, and α ranges up to some large countable ordinal). A primary example is the Wainer hierarchy, or Löb–Wainer hierarchy, which is an extension to all α < ε_{0}. Such hierarchies provide a natural way to classify computable functions according to rate-of-growth and computational complexity.

== Definition ==
Let μ be a large countable ordinal such that to every limit ordinal α < μ there is assigned a fundamental sequence (a strictly increasing sequence of ordinals whose supremum is α). A fast-growing hierarchy of functions f_{α}: N → N, for α < μ, is then defined as follows:

- $f_0(n) = n + 1,$
- $f_{\alpha+1}(n) = f_\alpha^n(n)$
- $f_\alpha(n) = f_{\alpha[n]}(n)$ if α is a limit ordinal.

Here f_{α}^{n}(n) = f_{α}(f_{α}(...(f_{α}(n))...)) denotes the n^{th} iterate of f_{α} applied to n, and α[n] denotes the n^{th} element of the fundamental sequence assigned to the limit ordinal α. (An alternative definition takes the number of iterations to be n+1, rather than n, in the second line above.)

First functions of the fast-growing hierarchy
Level	Formula	Mathematical function
$f_{0}(n)$	$n + 1$	Addition
$f_{1}(n)$	$f_{0}^{n}(n){=n+}\underbrace{ 1+1 \cdots+1 }_{n\text{ times +1}} = n + n = 2n$	Multiplication
$f_{2}(n)$	$f_{1}^{n}(n) = n \cdot \underbrace{ 2 \cdot \ldots \cdot 2 }_{n \text{ times } \cdot 2} = 2^{n} n$	Exponentiation
$f_{3}(n)$	$f_{2}^{n}(n) \ge 2^{n}n \cdot ((2^{n}n) \uparrow\uparrow (n-1)) \ge 2 \uparrow\uparrow n$	Tetration
$f_{m}(n)$	$f_{m-1}^{n}(n) \ge f_{m-1}(n) \uparrow^{m-1} n \ge 2 \uparrow^{m-1}n$	

First values of the fast-growing hierarchy
	1	2	3	...
$0$	$f_{0}(1)= 1 + 1 = 2$	$f_{0}(2)= 2 + 1 = 3$	$f_{0}(3)= 3 + 1 = 4$	...
$1$	$f_{1}(1)= 2 * 1 = 2$	$f_{1}(2)= 2 * 2 = 4$	$f_{1}(3)= 2 * 3 = 6$	...
$2$	$f_{2}(1)= 2^1 * 1 = 2$	$f_{2}(2)= 2^2 * 2 = 8$	$f_{2}(3) = 2^3 * 3 = 24$	...
$3$	$f_{3}(1) = 1 * 2^1 = 2$	$f_{3}(2) = f_{2}(f_{2}(2)) = f_{2}(8) = 8 * 2^8 = 2048$	$$\begin{align} f_{3}(3) &= f_{2}(f_{2}(f_{2}(3))) = f_{2}(f_{2}(24)) = f_{2}(24 * 2^{24}) \\ &= f_{2}(402653184) = 402653184 * 2^{402653184} \\ &\approx 6.895 * 10^{121210694} \approx 10^{1.212 * 10^8} \end{align}$$	...
$4$	$f_{4}(1) = f_{3}(1) = 2$	$f_{4}(2)= f_{3}(f_{3}(2)) = f_{3}(2048) \approx 10\uparrow\uparrow2049$	$f_{4}(3) = f_{3}(f_{3}(f_{3}(3))) \approx 10\uparrow\uparrow10\uparrow\uparrow10^{10^{115}}$	...
...	...	...	...	...

The initial part of this hierarchy, comprising the functions f_{α} with finite index (i.e., α < ω), is often called the Grzegorczyk hierarchy because of its close relationship to the Grzegorczyk hierarchy; note, however, that the former is here an indexed family of functions f_{n}, whereas the latter is an indexed family of sets of functions $\mathcal{E}^n$. (See Points of interest below.)

Generalizing the above definition even further, a fast iteration hierarchy is obtained by taking f_{0} to be any non-decreasing function g: N → N.

For limit ordinals not greater than ε_{0}, there is a straightforward natural definition of the fundamental sequences (see the Wainer hierarchy below), but beyond ε_{0} the definition is more complicated. However, this is possible well beyond the Feferman–Schütte ordinal, Γ_{0}, up to at least the Bachmann–Howard ordinal. Using Buchholz psi functions one can extend this definition to the ordinal of transfinitely iterated $\Pi^1_1$-comprehension (see Analytical hierarchy).

A fully specified extension beyond the computable ordinals is thought to be unlikely; e.g., Prӧmel and others note that in such an attempt "there would even arise problems in ordinal notation".

== The Wainer hierarchy ==
The Wainer hierarchy is the particular fast-growing hierarchy of functions f_{α} (α ≤ ε_{0}) obtained by defining the fundamental sequences as follows:

For limit ordinals λ < ε_{0}, written in Cantor normal form,

- if λ = ω^{α_{1}} + ... + ω^{α_{k−1}} + ω^{α_{k}} for α_{1} ≥ ... ≥ α_{k−1} ≥ α_{k}, then λ[n] = ω^{α_{1}} + ... + ω^{α_{k−1}} + ω^{α_{k}}[n],
- if λ = ω^{α+1}, then λ[n] = ω^{α}n,
- if λ = ω^{α} for a limit ordinal α, then λ[n] = ω^{α[n]},

and

- if λ = ε_{0}, take λ[0] = 0 and λ[n + 1] = ω^{λ[n]}; alternatively, take the same sequence except starting with λ[0] = 1.
  For n > 0, the alternative version has one additional ω in the resulting exponential tower, i.e. λ[n] = ω^{ω^{⋰^{ω}}} with n appearances of ω.

Some authors use slightly different definitions (e.g., ω^{α+1}[n] = ω^{α}(n+1), instead of ω^{α}n), and some define this hierarchy only for α < ε_{0} (thus excluding f_{ε_{0}} from the hierarchy).

To continue beyond ε_{0} the fundamental sequences for the Veblen hierarchy can be used.

== Points of interest ==
Following are some relevant points of interest about fast-growing hierarchies:

- Every f_{α} is a total function. If the fundamental sequences are computable (e.g., as in the Wainer hierarchy), then every f_{α} is a total computable function.
- In the Wainer hierarchy, f_{α} is dominated by f_{β} if α < β. (For any two functions f, g: N → N, f is said to dominate g if f(n) > g(n) for all sufficiently large n.) The same property holds in any fast-growing hierarchy with fundamental sequences satisfying the so-called Bachmann property. (This property holds for most natural well orderings.)
- In the Grzegorczyk hierarchy, every primitive recursive function is dominated by some f_{α} with α < ω. Hence, in the Wainer hierarchy, every primitive recursive function is dominated by f_{ω}, which is a variant of the Ackermann function.
- For n ≥ 3, the set $\mathcal{E}^n$ in the Grzegorczyk hierarchy is composed of just those total multi-argument functions which, for sufficiently large arguments, are computable within time bounded by some fixed iterate f_{n-1}^{k} evaluated at the maximum argument.
- In the Wainer hierarchy, every f_{α} with α < ε_{0} is computable and provably total in Peano arithmetic.
- Every computable function that is provably total in Peano arithmetic is dominated by some f_{α} with α < ε_{0} in the Wainer hierarchy. Hence f_{ε_{0}} in the Wainer hierarchy is not provably total in Peano arithmetic.
- The Goodstein function has approximately the same growth rate (i.e. each is dominated by some fixed iterate of the other) as f_{ε_{0}} in the Wainer hierarchy, dominating every f_{α} for which α < ε_{0}, and hence is not provably total in Peano Arithmetic.
- In the Wainer hierarchy, if α < β < ε_{0}, then f_{β} dominates every computable function within time and space bounded by some fixed iterate f_{α}^{k}.
- Friedman's TREE function dominates f_{Γ_{0}} in a fast-growing hierarchy.
- The Wainer hierarchy of functions f_{α} and the Hardy hierarchy of functions h_{α} are related by f_{α} = h_{ω^{α}} for all α < ε_{0}. The Hardy hierarchy "catches up" to the Wainer hierarchy at α = ε_{0}, such that f_{ε_{0}} and h_{ε_{0}} have the same growth rate, in the sense that f_{ε_{0}}(n-1) ≤ h_{ε_{0}}(n) ≤ f_{ε_{0}}(n+1) for all n ≥ 1.
- The slow-growing hierarchy of functions g_{α} attains the same growth rate as the function f_{ε_{0}} in the Wainer hierarchy when α is the Bachmann–Howard ordinal. Furthermore, the slow-growing hierarchy g_{α} attains the same growth rate as f_{α} (in a particular fast-growing hierarchy) when α is the ordinal of the theory ID_{<ω} of arbitrary finite iterations of an inductive definition.

== Functions in fast-growing hierarchies ==
The functions at finite levels (α < ω) of any fast-growing hierarchy coincide with those of the Grzegorczyk hierarchy: (using hyperoperation)

- f_{0}(n) = n + 1 = 2[1]n − 1
- f_{1}(n) = f_{0}^{n}(n) = n + n = 2n = 2[2]n
- f_{2}(n) = f_{1}^{n}(n) = 2^{n} · n > 2^{n} = 2[3]n for n ≥ 2
- f_{k+1}(n) = f_{k}^{n}(n) > (2[k + 1])^{n} n ≥ 2[k + 2]n for n ≥ 2, k < ω.

Beyond the finite levels are the functions of the Wainer hierarchy (ω ≤ α ≤ ε_{0}):

- f_{ω}(n) = f_{n}(n) > 2[n + 1]n > 2[n](n + 3) − 3 = A(n, n) for n ≥ 4, where A is the Ackermann function (of which f_{ω} is a unary version).
- f_{ω+1}(n) = f_{ω}^{n}(n) ≥ f_{n[n + 2]n}(n) for all n > 0, where n[n + 2]n is the n^{th} Ackermann number.
- f_{ω+1}(64) = f_{ω}^{64}(64) > Graham's number (= g_{64} in the sequence defined by g_{0} = 4, g_{k+1} = 3[g_{k} + 2]3). This follows by noting f_{ω}(n) > 2[n + 1]n > 3[n]3 + 2, and hence f_{ω}(g_{k} + 2) > g_{k+1} + 2.
- f_{ε_{0}}(n) is the first function in the Wainer hierarchy that dominates the Goodstein function.

== See also ==
- Grzegorczyk hierarchy
- Hyperoperation
- Ackermann function
- LOOP programming language
