= Fundamental sequence (set theory) =

In set theory, a mathematical discipline, a fundamental sequence is a cofinal sequence of ordinals all below a given limit ordinal. Depending on author, fundamental sequences may be restricted to ω-sequences only or permit fundamental sequences of length $\mathrm{\omega}_1$. The $n^{\text{th}}$ element of the fundamental sequence of $\alpha$ is commonly denoted $\alpha[n]$, although it may be denoted $\alpha_n$ or $\{\alpha\}(n)$. Additionally, some authors may allow fundamental sequences to be defined on successor ordinals. The term dates back to (at the latest) Veblen's construction of normal functions $\varphi_\alpha$, while the concept dates back to Hardy's 1904 attempt to construct a set of cardinality $\aleph_1$.

== Definition ==
Given an ordinal $\alpha$, a fundamental sequence for $\alpha$ is a sequence $(\alpha[n])_{n\in\mathbb N}$ such that $\forall(n\in\mathbb N)(\alpha[n]<\alpha)$ and $\textrm{sup}\{\alpha[n]\mid n\in\mathbb N\}=\alpha$. An additional restriction may be that the sequence of ordinals must be strictly increasing.

== Examples ==
The following is a common assignment of fundamental sequences to all limit ordinals less than $\varepsilon_0$.

- $\omega^{\alpha+1}[n]=\omega^\alpha\cdot(n+1)$
- $\omega^\alpha[n]=\omega^{\alpha[n]}$ for limit ordinals $\alpha$
- $(\omega^{\alpha_1}+\ldots+\omega^{\alpha_k})[n]=\omega^{\alpha_1}+\ldots+(\omega^{\alpha_k}[n])$ for $\alpha_1 \geq \dots \geq \alpha_k$.

This is very similar to the system used in the Wainer hierarchy.

== Usage ==
Fundamental sequences arise in some settings of definitions of large countable ordinals, definitions of hierarchies of fast-growing functions, and proof theory. Bachmann defined a hierarchy of functions $\phi_\alpha$ in 1950, providing a system of names for ordinals up to what is now known as the Bachmann–Howard ordinal, by defining fundamental sequences for namable ordinals below $\omega_1$. This system was subsequently simplified by Feferman and Aczel to reduce the reliance on fundamental sequences.

The fast-growing hierarchy, Hardy hierarchy, and slow-growing hierarchy of functions are all defined via a chosen system of fundamental sequences up to a given ordinal. The fast-growing hierarchy is closely related to the Hardy hierarchy, which is used in proof theory along with the slow-growing hierarchy to majorize the provably computable functions of a given theory. Fundamental sequences also have applications in computability theory and the Turing jump.

=== Additional conditions ===
A system of fundamental sequences up to $\alpha$ is said to have the Bachmann property if for all ordinals $\alpha,\beta$ in the domain of the system and for all $n\in\mathbb N$, $\alpha[n]<\beta<\alpha\implies\alpha[n]<\beta[0]$. If a system of fundamental sequences has the Bachmann property, all the functions in its associated fast-growing hierarchy are monotone, and $f_\beta$ eventually dominates $f_\alpha$ when $\alpha<\beta$.
