= Veblen (disambiguation) =

Thorstein Veblen (1857–1929) was an American economist and sociologist.

Veblen may also refer to:

- Thomas T. Veblen (born 1947), American forester
- Oswald Veblen (1880–1960), American mathematician (Thorstein Veblen's nephew)
- Veblen function, a hierarchy of normal functions
- Veblen good, named after Thorstein Veblen
- Veblen, South Dakota, city in Marshall County, South Dakota, United States
- Veblen ordinals, two large countable ordinal numbers
- 31665 Veblen, main-belt asteroid
