= Multiperspectivalism =

Approach to knowledge

Multiperspectivalism (sometimes triperspectivalism) is an approach to knowledge advocated by Calvinist philosophers John Frame and Vern Poythress.

Frame laid out the idea with respect to a general epistemology in his 1987 work The Doctrine of the Knowledge of God, where he suggests that in every act of knowing, the knower is in constant contact with three things (or "perspectives") – the knowing subject himself, the object of knowledge, and the standard or criteria by which knowledge is attained. He argues that each perspective is interrelated to the others in such a fashion that, in knowing one of these, one actually knows the other two, also. Poythress developed the theme with respect to science in his 1976 book Philosophy, Science, and the Sovereignty of God and with respect to theology in his 1987 book Symphonic Theology.

== Epistemology ==
=== The normative perspective ===
Frame suggests that in all acts undertaken by humans there is some standard that serves as a guide, and that guide tells people what is the proper subject of inquiry, what actions they should pursue and avoid, what the universe is really like, and how knowledge should be sought. In his view, the marketplace of ideas is full of worldviews competing for the allegiance of each individual, and for some people, final allegiance to a system is due to sense experience, emotions, or political affiliation, while for others it is their particular religious tradition or secular philosophy. Whatever serves as a person's final authority, Frame says, functions as his or her normative perspective.

Christians such as Frame believe that God has verbally revealed himself to mankind in the Bible for the purpose of providing everything people need for life. In this view, Frame suggests, God’s inspired word serves as the criteria by which all truth claims are to be checked, and God’s word dictates to humanity who he is, the true nature of the world around us, and who people are in relation to God and the world. Thus, for Frame as for Calvin, the Christian Scriptures serve as the lens through which one ought to see and evaluate everything, and even in knowing the Bible, he suggests that one knows both the world and himself (and, conversely, in knowing them both one comes to know Scriptures better).

=== The situational perspective ===
With the situational perspective, Frame refers to the facts of reality or the objects of knowledge. With this perspective in mind, he says one must acknowledge the details of history, science, and evidences for various beliefs, and yet, science, history, and the evidences can never to be interpreted in a fashion that ignores or sets aside the binding nature of the normative perspective. Viewing things from Frame's situational perspective, one looks for how the normative perspective is expressed in everyday life.

Thus, without an understanding of the world, Frame says, one cannot rightly understand or apply Scripture to his or her life. For example, an argument against abortion might run:

1. Murder is a sin.
2. Abortion is murder.
3. Therefore abortion is a sin.

In Frame's scheme, the first point provides us with a normative command from the Bible, which serves as a timeless moral principle. But in order to arrive at the conclusion one needs to know whether or not abortion is really the taking the life of an innocent, unborn person, which requires use of the situational perspective. One must study medical examinations of the nature of a fetus, the process of biogenesis, and the abortion procedure itself, since without this crucial information one could never know whether the person was faithfully applying God’s word in one's life.

=== The existential perspective ===
With the existential perspective, Frame draws attention back to the person doing the knowing because, he says, individuals bring their personal dispositions, temperaments, biases, presuppositions, and life experiences to every act of knowing. A problem common to all epistemological endeavors is that if one tries to formulate a true-to-life epistemology, one apparently must examine each and every action performed, but formulating every action into propositions for evaluation is quite tricky. For this reason, the Enlightenment model of epistemology viewed the knowing enterprise as something hampered by human subjectivity and sought an objective mode of knowing that excludes Frame's existential perspective. Frame notes that the search for a purely objective knowledge is not only impossible, but also idolatrous. States Frame:

"Sometimes we dream fondly of a 'purely objective' knowledge of God—a knowledge of God of freed from the limitations of our senses, minds, experiences, preparation, and so forth. But nothing of this sort is possible, and God does not demand that of us. Rather, He condescends to dwell in and with us, as in a temple. He identifies himself in and through our thoughts, ideas, and experiences. And that identification is clear; it is adequate for Christian certainty. A 'purely objective' knowledge is precisely what we don’t want! Such knowledge would presuppose a denial of our creaturehood and thus a denial of God and of all truth." (DKG, 65)

=== Integration of the perspectives ===
Frame argues that in order to appreciate the richness of the human knowing process, one must see that every instance of knowing involves these three perspectives. Esther Meek, following Frame's model closely, calls these perspectives the rules, the self, and the world, and emphasizing the existential perspective, she states, "Knowing is the responsible human struggle to rely on clues to focus on a coherent pattern and submit to its reality" (LTK, 1). Knowing in this sense is thus the process of integration by which one focuses on a pattern by means of various clues in the world, one's body-sense, and the norms for thinking.

Through this integration process the clues take on greater significance such that they are no longer seemingly disconnected occurrences, but rather meaningful portions that make up a greater reality. Yet, it is claimed, the pattern or integration, once achieved, retroactively throws light on the "clues" that made it up. The particulars retain their meaningfulness, but it is enhanced and transformed. These patterns now shape the knower, because, ideally, they connect her with a reality independent of herself. One comes to see the fullness of the pattern when its truth is lived in (or "inhabited"), thus extending one's self out into the world by means of that truth.

Much of this pattern-making process is inarticulatable, but Frame and Meek believe this more-than-words aspect of epistemic acts cannot be ignored because he sees it as crucial in the common, everyday process of knowing.

== Science ==
With respect to science, Poythress developed a multiperspectival approach, which he views as "a means of avoiding unhealthy dualism" (Philosophy, p. 103). between the spiritual and the material worlds.

== Theology ==
Poythress further expounded a multiperspectival approach to theology in his Symphonic Theology.

== See also ==
- Perspectivism

== Bibliography ==
- John Frame (1987). The Doctrine of the Knowledge of God. Theology of Lordship Series. ISBN 0-87552-262-9.
- John Frame. "A Primer on Perspectivalism".
- Esther Meek (2003). Longing to Know. Brazos Press. ISBN 978-1-58743-060-2.
- Vern Poythress (2004) [1976]. Philosophy, Science, and the Sovereignty of God. Presbyterian and Reformed. ISBN 978-1596380028.
- Vern Poythress (1987). Symphonic Theology: The Validity of Multiple Perspectives in Theology. Zondervan. ISBN 978-0-87552-517-4. Archived from the original on 2007-07-21.
