= Herrontown Woods Arboretum =

Arboretum in Princeton, New Jersey

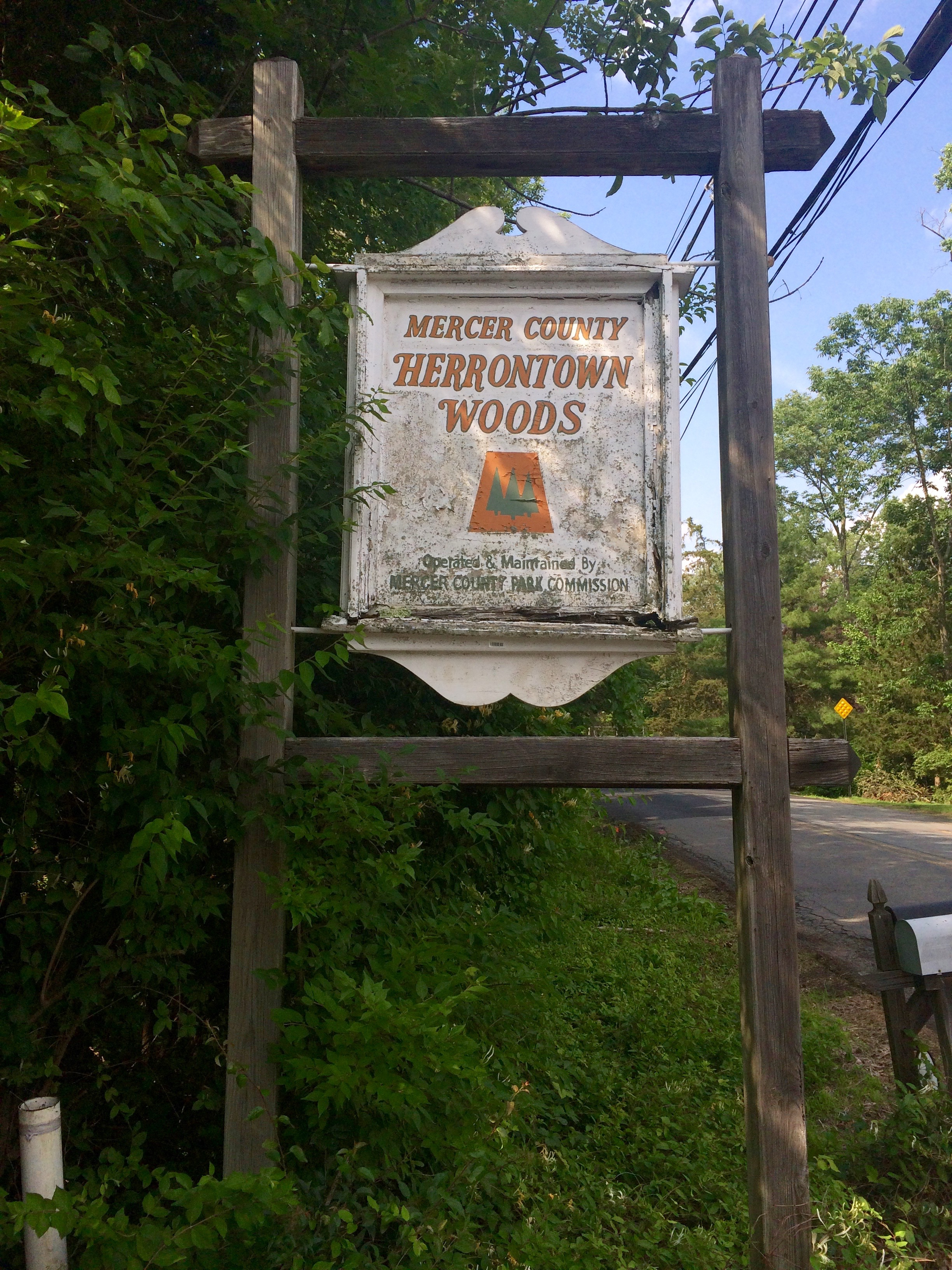
- The entrance to the arboretum from Snowden Lane

- Location within Mercer County, New Jersey
- Location: 624 Snowden Lane, Princeton, New Jersey
- Coordinates: 40.38196°N 74.64695°W
- Area: 142 acres (57 ha)
- Created: 1957
- Operator: Mercer County, New Jersey
- Status: Open all year
- Website: Official website

Herrontown Woods Arboretum (142 acres) is an arboretum located on Snowden Lane near the junction with Herrontown Road, in Princeton, New Jersey. The arboretum is open to the public every day at no cost. There are walking trails, but trail bicycles are prohibited.

== Description ==
This land is preserved in its natural state (except for a pipeline right-of-way, which crosses the woods). Several miles of walking trails lead through hardwood forest up to the Princeton ridge and the headwaters of a tributary of Harry's Brook. It contains wetlands, frogs and salamanders, and over 60 species of native trees and shrubs, along with wildflowers, rare birds, and diabase rocks containing magnetite. After storms blew down a pine forest, the Friends of Herrontown Wood created a Botanical Art Garden ("Barden") with sculptures, found objects, and over 150 species of native plants.

== History ==
=== Herrontown Woods ===
The first 81 acres (33 ha) of the arboretum were donated to the Mercer County Park Commission in 1957 by internationally renowned mathematician Prof. Oswald Veblen (1880-1960) of the Institute for Advanced Study. The gift was valued at $154,000 and was Mercer County's and the town of Princeton's first nature preserve. In 1966 the Park Commission approved a 47 acres (19 ha) expansion of the Woods. When Elizabeth Veblen died in 1974, the Veblens' remaining 14 acres (5.7 ha) were added to the park, including a cottage and house. In 2019, through the initiative of the Friends of Herrontown Woods, 7.5 acres of Windy Top homeowners association land was donated by the developer.

=== Autumn Hill Reservation ===
In 1967 Princeton Township and Princeton Borough jointly purchased 72 acres (29 ha) of former hardscrabble farms returned to woodland, north of Herrontown Road, across the street from the arboretum, for preservation as the Autumn Hill Reservation. This stretch of land is sometimes referred to as the Herrontown Woods extension. The reservation has a trail loop, originally installed as part of an Eagle Scout service project by Boy Scout Troop 43. A small parking lot on Herrontown Road, west of its junction with Snowden, provides access.

== Trail access ==
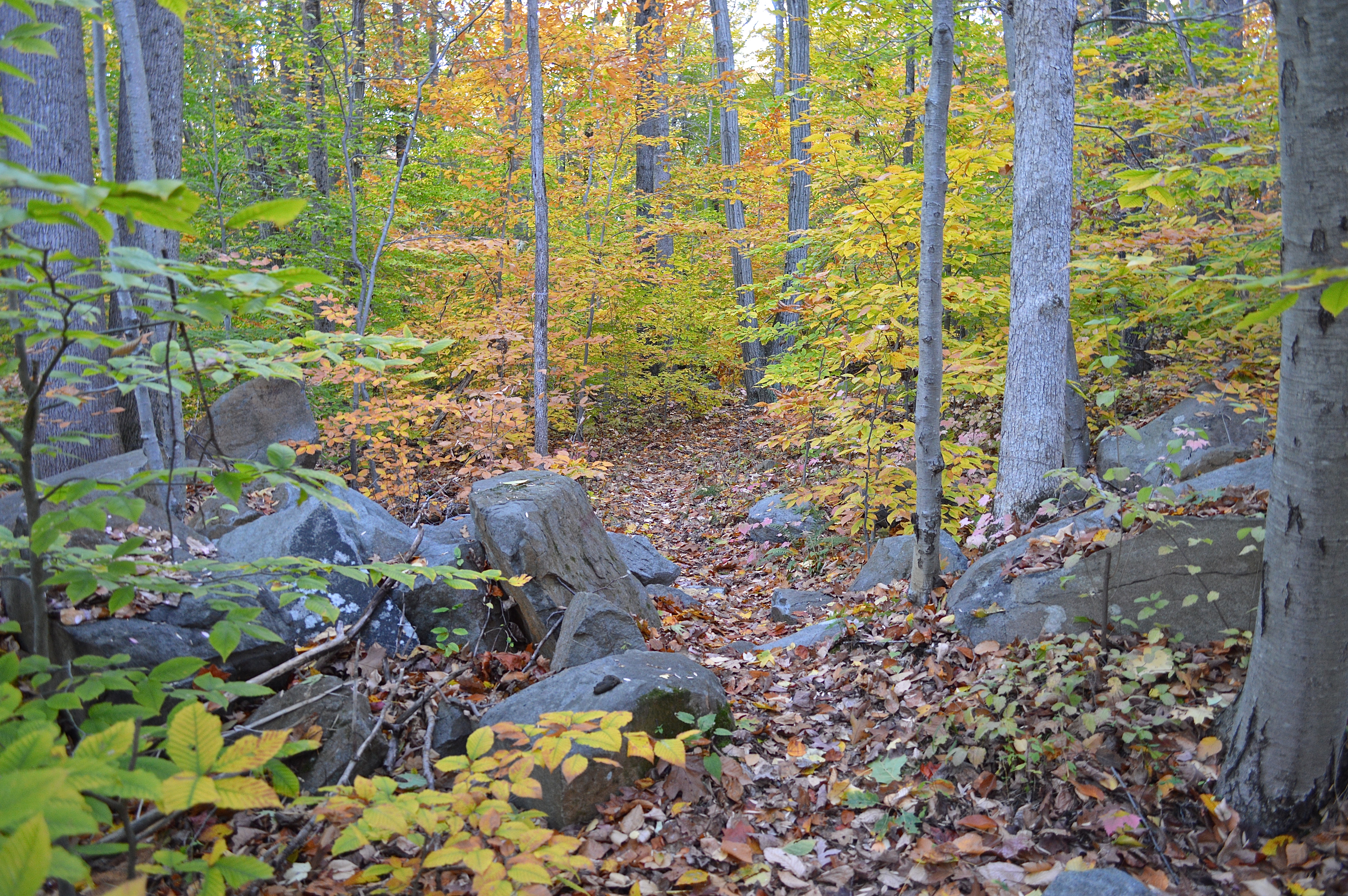

The woods can be accessed from a parking lot off of Snowden Lane on the east side of the arboretum. In 2010, an adjoining 35 acres (14 ha) tract of land owned by All Saints Episcopal Church was purchased for preservation by the D&R Greenway Land Trust. This enabled trails to be added reaching to the south, accessing both the church and the former Church & Dwight headquarters on Bunn Drive.

In October, 2014, trail access was added from Stone Hill Church, on the west side of the woods, off Bunn Drive, through the joint effort of the Friends of Herrontown Woods and the church youth group. Visitors are free to park at the church, apart from Sunday mornings, to access the trails.

== Gallery ==
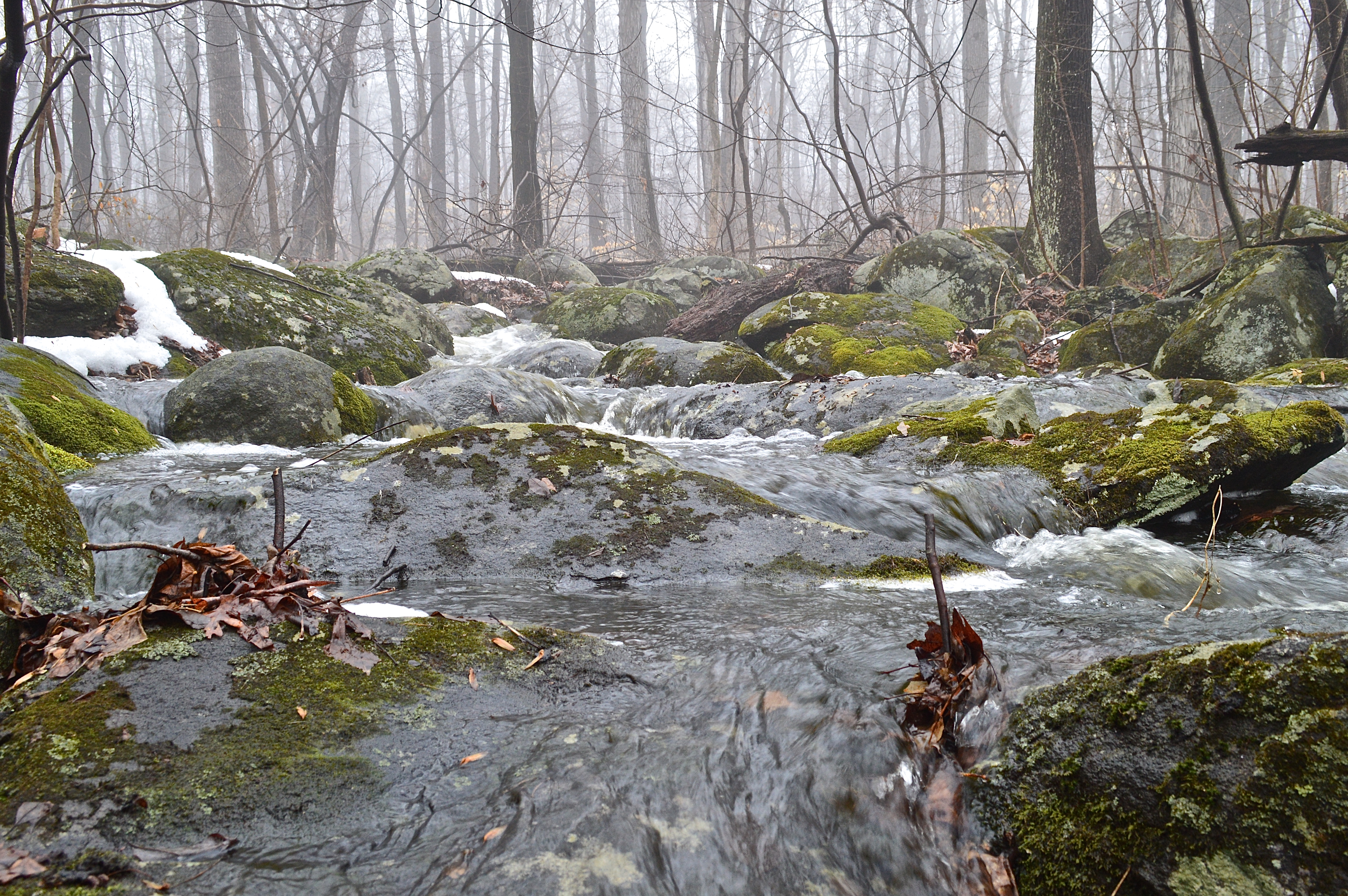

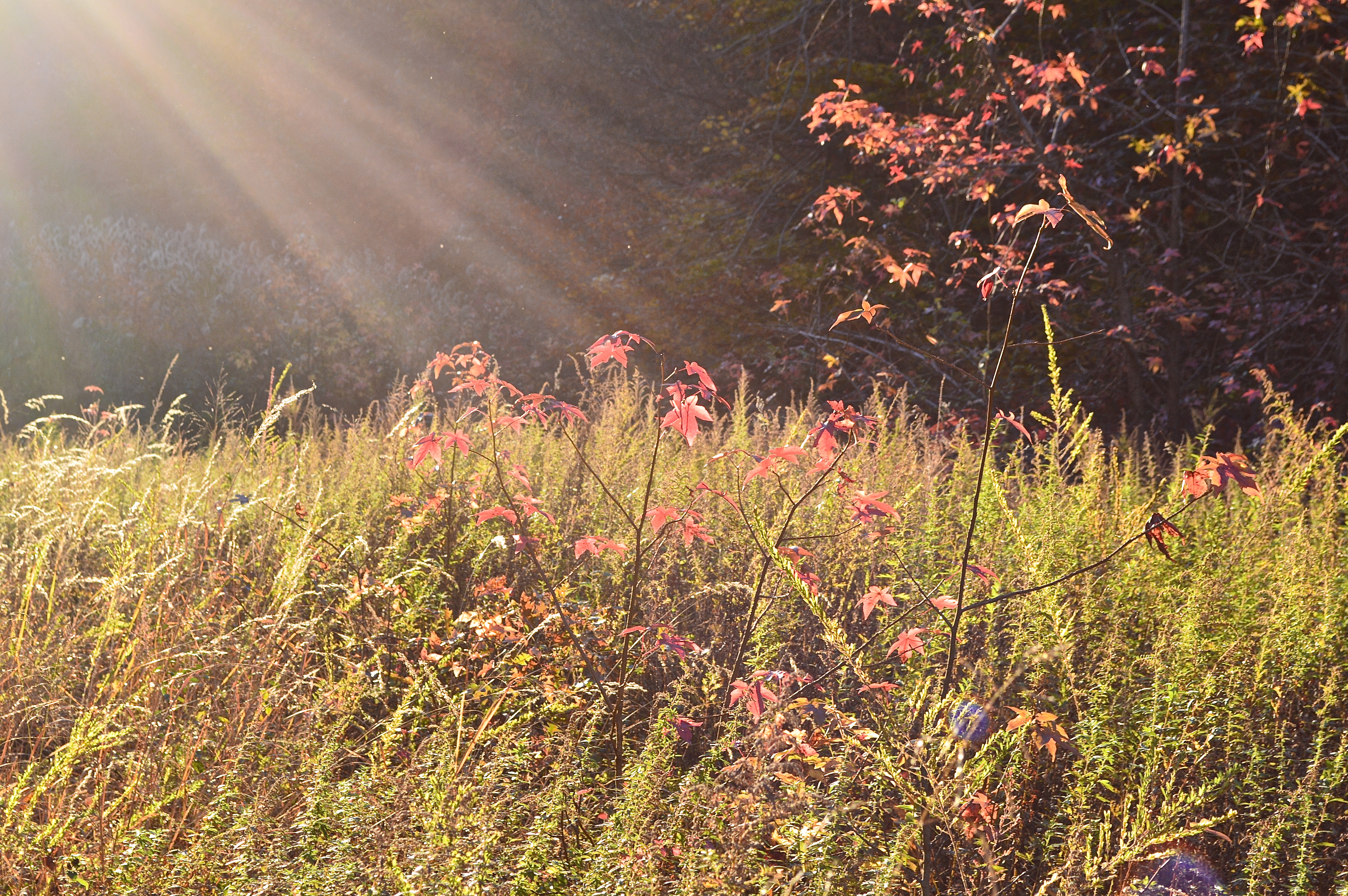

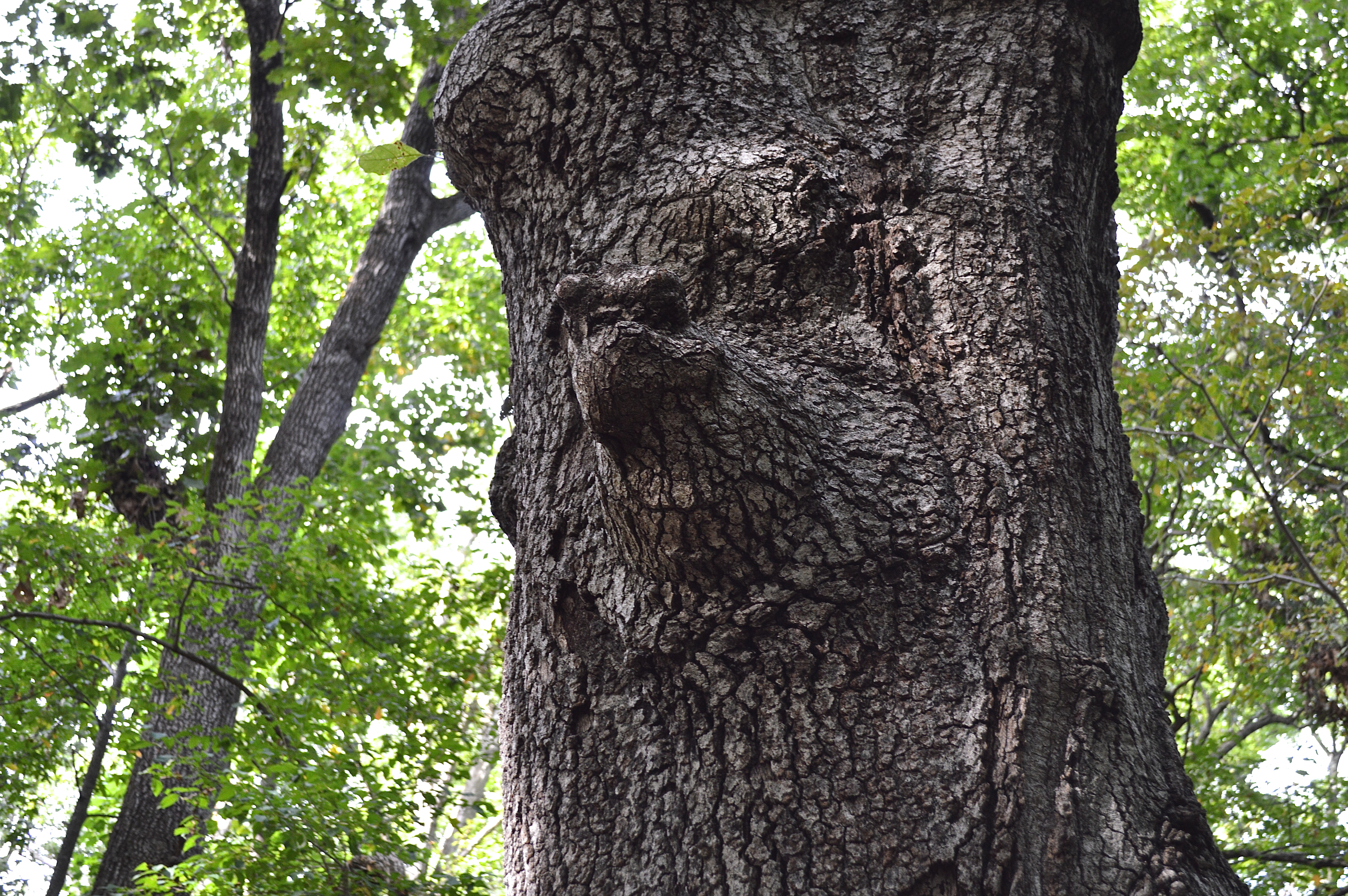

== See also ==
- List of botanical gardens in the United States
