= Elmer William Engstrom =

American engineer (1901–1984)

- Born: August 25, 1901; Minneapolis, Minnesota
- Died: October 30, 1984 (aged 83); Hightstown, New Jersey
- Occupation: Electrical engineer
- Spouse: Phoebe Leander

Elmer William Engstrom (August 25, 1901 – October 30, 1984) was an American electrical engineer and corporate executive prominent for his role in the development of television.

== Biography ==
=== Youth and early career ===
Engstrom was born in Minneapolis, Minnesota, in 1901 as son of Emil Engstrom, a power plant engineer, and Anna (Nelson) Engstrom. After attending the Mechanical Arte High School in Saint Paul, Minnesota, he obtained his BSc in electrical engineering at the University of Minnesota in 1923.

After graduation, in 1923, Engstrom worked at the General Electric Company in Schenectady, New York, on radio technology and sound devices for motion pictures. When this activity was spun off to the Radio Corporation of America (RCA) in 1930, he took on further responsibilities for these technologies plus research in electron tubes.

=== Further career ===
Engstrom subsequently became head of RCA Laboratories (1943) and Vice President for research (1945), leading RCA's successful World War II efforts in radar, radio, and acoustics. In the immediate aftermath of the war he participated in relief efforts for central Europe and Germany. In his role as head of research, he led RCA's development of its first all-electronic color television system after the war, as well as national efforts including BMEWS (the Ballistic Missile Early Warning System) and the TIROS (Television Infrared Observation Satellite) weather-reporting satellite system. RCA's Astro-Electronics Division (1958) was the first organization within the electronics industry to develop space electronic systems.

Engstrom became RCA's President (1961–1965) and Chief Executive Officer (1966–1968), serving on its board until 1971. He served on numerous national advisory panels, was a founding member of the United States National Academy of Engineering, and received honorary degrees from eighteen colleges and universities including Drexel Institute of Technology, Findlay College, and New York University. The Swedish Academy of Engineering Sciences in 1949 awarded him its silver medal and in 1956 named him a corresponding member. In 1956 he was awarded the John Ericson medal of the American Society of Swedish Engineers. He was an IEEE Fellow and received numerous awards, including the IEEE Founders Medal in 1966 "For his leadership in management and integration of research and development programs and for his foresighted application of the systems engineering concept in bringing television to the public."

== Work ==
=== Research and development efforts for television ===
During the 1930s, Engstrom led RCA's research and development efforts for television, culminating in the company's first commercial black and white television system. Its first complete test took place in 1939, with a transmitter installed on the 85th floor of the Empire State Building. A mechanical scanner provided a 120-line, 24-frame picture from live and film subjects, and extensive field tests took place with the first cathode ray tube receivers. Although picture quality was poor, the tests conclusively proved the feasibility of television broadcasting. This effort was one of the earliest applications of a system engineering approach, now standard practice on large technical programs.

=== Civic and Christian leader ===
Engstrom was prominent in a number of educational, professional, and civic organizations. He was active in the Princeton chapters of the American Red Cross, Sigma Xi, the Rotary Club and the YMCA-YWCA. He was also a member of Westerly Road Church, where he served many years as the president of the board of trustees.

Engstrom was an active Christian leader, writing for Campus Crusade for Christ:

There is one fundamental concept I have learned very clearly from my business experience. There is a need for a definite and clearly understood charter for one's operations. Having established that charter, there is need for complete belief in it and in the program which it provides. In the Christian life the Bible is our charter. It is the supreme authority for our lives and it is sufficient for our needs. I believe it is a requirement of paramount importance that Christ be the Lord of our whole life, and that our allegiance to Him be in no way divisible.

The Department of Engineering and Computer Science at Cedarville University is named in his honor.

== Selected publications ==
- Engstrom, E. W. "A study of television image characteristics." Proceedings of the Institute of Radio Engineers 21.12 (1933): 1631-1651.
- Engstrom, E. W. "An Experimental Television System: Part I-Introduction." Proceedings of the Institute of Radio Engineers 22.11 (1934): 1241-1245.
- Engstrom, E. W. "A study of television image characteristics: Part Two: Determination of frame frequency for television in terms of flicker characteristics." Proceedings of the Institute of Radio Engineers 23.4 (1935): 295-310.
- Engstrom, E. W. "Systems engineering: A growing concept." Electrical Engineering 76.2 (1957): 113-116.
- Engstrom, Elmer W. "Science, technology, and statesmanship." American Scientist 55.1 (1967): 72-79.
