= Stone Hill Church of Princeton =

Nondenominational church in New Jersey, United States

Stone Hill Church
- Stone Hill Church of Princeton
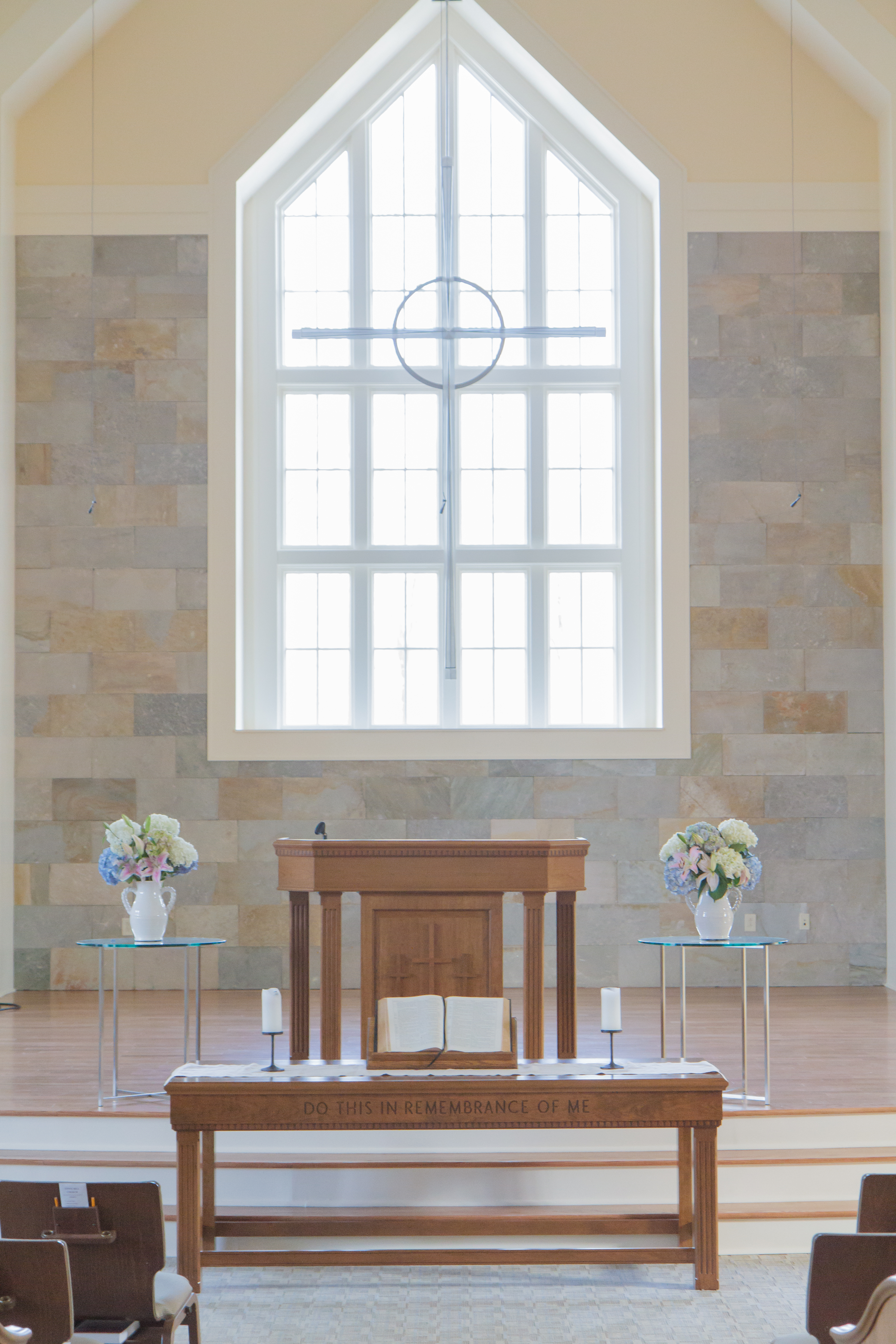

- Stone Hill Church on a map of Mercer County, NJ
- 40°23′1.6″N 74°38′51.1″W
- Location: Princeton, New Jersey
- Country: United States
- Denomination: Nondenominational
- Churchmanship: Evangelical
- Website: stonehillprinceton.org

History
- Former name: Westerly Road Church
- Founder(s): Helen, Dorothy, and W. Butler Harris
- Dedicated: November 25, 1956 (Westerly), March 9, 2014 (Stone Hill)

Stone Hill Church of Princeton is a gospel-centered, nondenominational church in Princeton, New Jersey, United States. The church was founded in 1956 as Westerly Road Church at the intersection of Westerly and Wilson Roads. In 2013, it constructed a new facility and relocated to 1025 Bunn Drive and changed its name to Stone Hill Church of Princeton.

== History ==
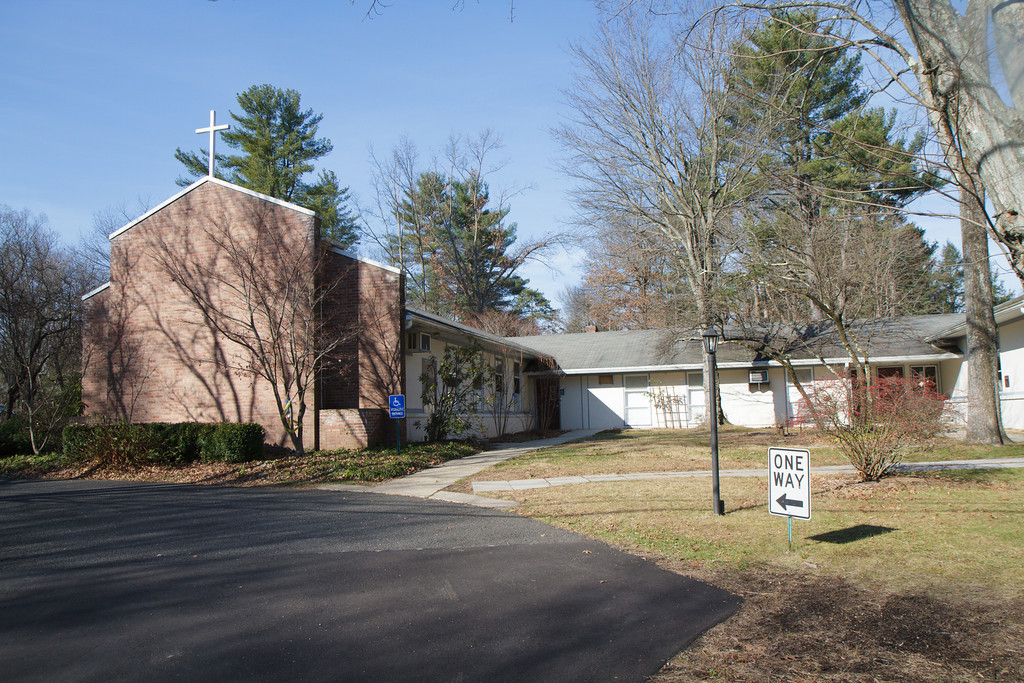
Westerly Road Church

Westerly Road Church was founded at the initiative of two sisters, Helen and Dorothy Harris, with the support of their brother W. Butler Harris, on land along Westerly Road which they donated to the church. The Harris siblings were the children of Princeton Professor Walter Butler Harris, and grandchildren of the Rev. William Harris, a treasurer of Princeton University. The Harris siblings, along with many of the early members of Westerly Road, including Elmer Engstrom, were previously communicants of First Presbyterian Church but were dissatisfied with its theological direction under John R. Bodo. Their intention was to have a church where Biblical teaching and missionary activity were emphasized. The original structure cost $30,000, raised by the 22 charter members, and was bought pre-fabricated from U.S. Steel Homes Inc. The sanctuary arrived via train at the Princeton Junction Train Station and was trucked to the site at Westerly and Wilson Roads on the border of the former Princeton Borough and Princeton Township. At the time of construction, the roads were not yet put through and there was no opposition to the church's request for a zoning variance to allow for a religious use in a residential zone. The Harris siblings arranged to call Edward H. Morgan, their cousin, as the first pastor, a position he held until his retirement in 1980. The parsonage was built at 25 Westerly Road, which later served as the church offices until the relocation to 1025 Bunn Drive. The first services were held on November 25, 1956 with 100 in attendance at the morning service and 30 at the evening.

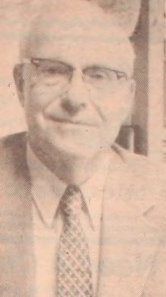
The Rev. Ed Morgan, founding pastor of Westerly Road Church.

Morgan was educated at Hotchkiss, a member of the Princeton University class of 1938, and a 1942 graduate of the Princeton Theological Seminary. His great-uncle, William Henry Green spent fifty years as a professor of Princeton Seminary. Morgan had already been serving as the pastor of a Presbyterian church in Philadelphia when he experienced what he described as his true conversion to the Christian faith, a conversion which ultimately led to him accepting the call to be founding pastor of Westerly Road. The number of children in the congregation grew rapidly, with the Sunday school including 85 children within two years of the congregation's founding. This led to the addition of seven classrooms and an assembly hall in the spring of 1959, and another ten room addition in time for the church's tenth anniversary in 1966. The young congregation was one of the first in Princeton to offer Vacation Bible School with attendance nearing 100 children by the summer of 1962. The church was also an early supporter of dedicated youth ministry, including supporting a Princeton chapter of Young Life when it faced opposition from other area clergy. In 1964, Morgan said of Young Life that, "They reach a lot of teenagers who go to no church at all or who are indifferent church members. They present, in a rather unique way, what Christ can do for young people." The church's early commitment to children and youth continues today.

By the time that Morgan retired in 1980, the congregation was giving 50% of all general fund contributions to mission work, including providing partial support for 28 missionary families. Most of those families were made up of those who had grown up in the church or entered it as students at the university.

Morgan helped to initiate and encourage the longstanding connection of the congregation to Princeton University by speaking on campus in conjunction with the Princeton Christian Fellowship. This connection to PCF and the campus brought the future theologian John Frame into the congregation.

By the mid-70s the church had grown to 250 members and a plan was proposed to build a larger sanctuary. However, the Princeton Township Zoning Board denied the necessary variance for parking, leading the congregation to instead plant a daughter church, Windsor Chapel, in 1976 with Morgan's son called as pastor.

Morgan retired in 1980 and was succeeded by Paul Bawden, who served in that position until 1985.

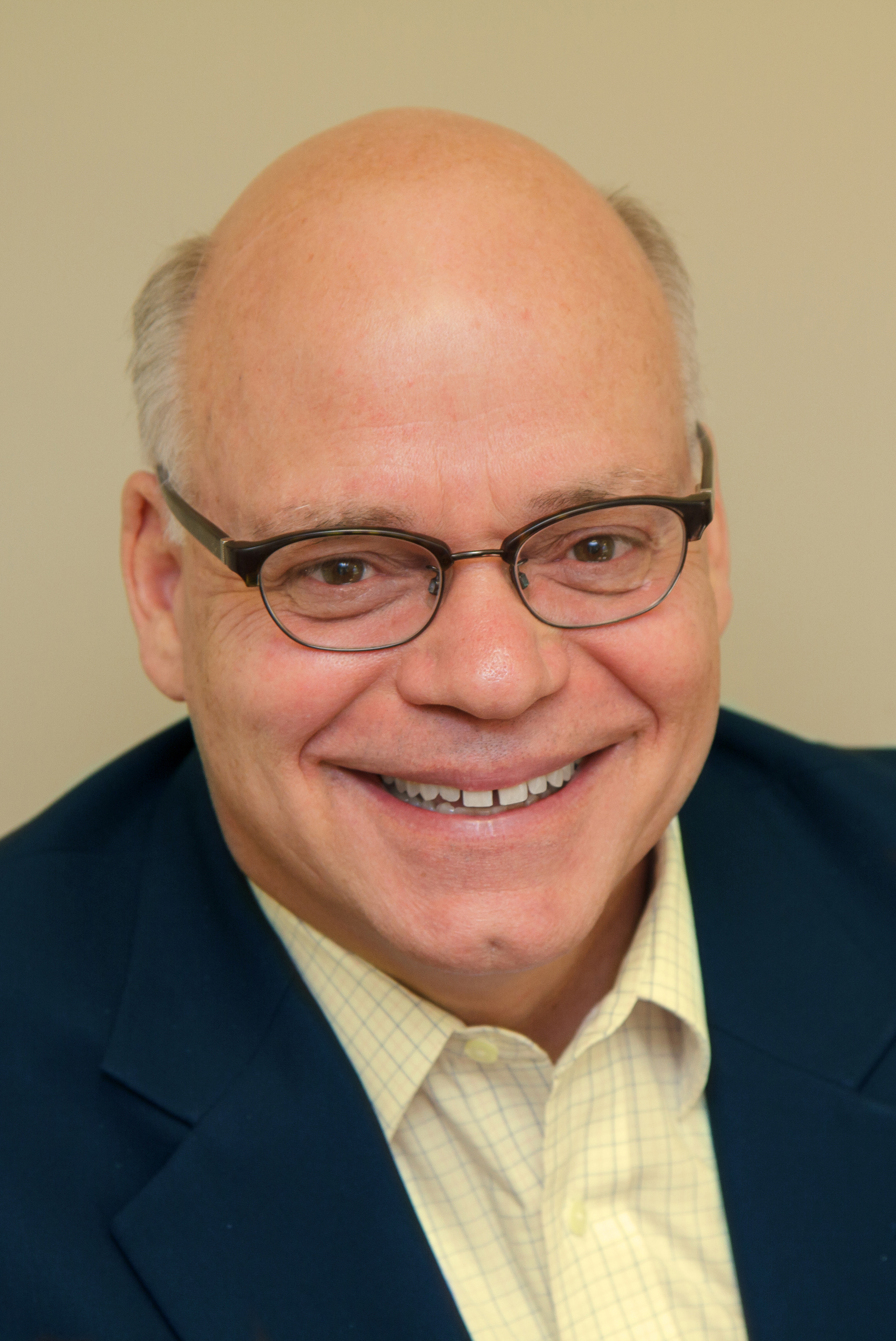
Matt Ristuccia.

In 1985, Matthew P. Ristuccia was called as senior pastor. Educated at Phillips Academy and Princeton, he received a degree in Master of Divinity from Grace Theological Seminary and his doctor of ministry from Dallas Theological Seminary. Ristuccia first joined the church after experiencing an evangelical conversion during his time as an undergraduate at the nearby university. Ristuccia also met his wife, Karen, during his time as an undergraduate, their romance as students providing fodder for a piece in a local newspaper in later years.

In the 1980s the Learning Center was founded to supplement the education of homeschooled students. The relationship with the university continued, including the presence of faculty members such as James Rankin of the German Department, who started his service as church pianist in the early 1990s.

In July, 2020 Ristuccia retired and was succeeded by his longtime associate pastor, Tracy Troxel.

=== Relocation ===
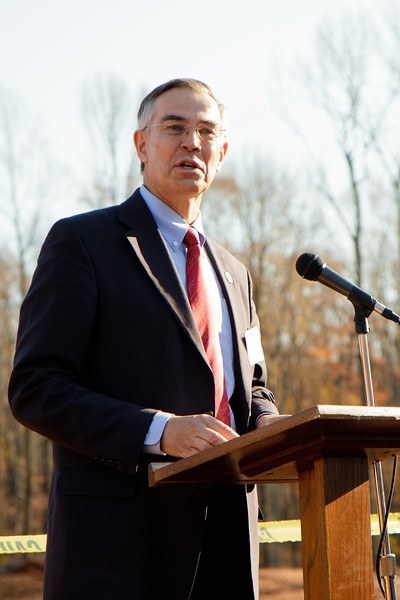
Congressman Rush Holt speaking at the groundbreaking ceremony for Stone Hill Church of Princeton.

Letter from Congressman Rush Holt to Stone Hill Church of Princeton on the occasion of their dedication.

The congregation remained on Westerly Road for 57 years but by the mid 1990s the church was housing a congregation of 500 in a building designed for 125 and sought to add a two-story addition to the property on Westerly Road. Under the existing zoning, the proposed 23,000 square foot final structure was permitted. In response to the church's proposal the Princeton Township Committee passed a zoning amendment that would severely restrict the ability of the church to expand on its current property. The zoning change limited churches in residential zones in Princeton Township to a Floor area ratio (FAR) of 0.125 instead of the previous 0.20. This meant a requirement that the total square footage of the building equal no more than 12.5% of the lot, essentially preventing any addition to the existing structure. This zoning limitation was more restrictive than that applied to The Hun School, Princeton Day School, and Stuart Country Day School, as well as neighboring homes. In 2004, the church attempted to relocate to a site on Princeton Pike in Lawrence Township but the requested zoning variance was denied.

In 2010, a piece of property became available at 1025 Bunn Drive in the northeast section of Princeton, with zoning appropriate for a church. After a lengthy process of approvals, marked by some vocal opposition, the congregation gained the requisite permissions to build and relocate. A new LEED certified facility of nearly 50,000 square feet was opened in December 2013. The church granted a permanent conservation easement over the wetlands on the southern third of the site, allowing for trail access to the Herrontown Woods Arboretum from Bunn Drive. With the departure from Westerly Road, a name change was deemed appropriate, and the church elders unanimously agreed upon Stone Hill Church of Princeton. The Stone Hill is a reference to the Rocky Hill Ridge on which the new building is located and the significant amount of stone that needed to be removed to allow for the foundation. The original building was demolished to allow for subdivision into residential lots in accordance with the zoning. The new fellowship hall was named in honor of the Harris family, the three siblings who founded the church and donated the original land. The new prayer chapel was named in honor of Westerly and became home to the previous building's communion table and cross.

== Notable members ==
- Elmer William Engstrom, CEO of RCA
- John Frame, Reformed theologian
- Donald B. Fullerton, founder of the Princeton Christian Fellowship

== Gallery ==
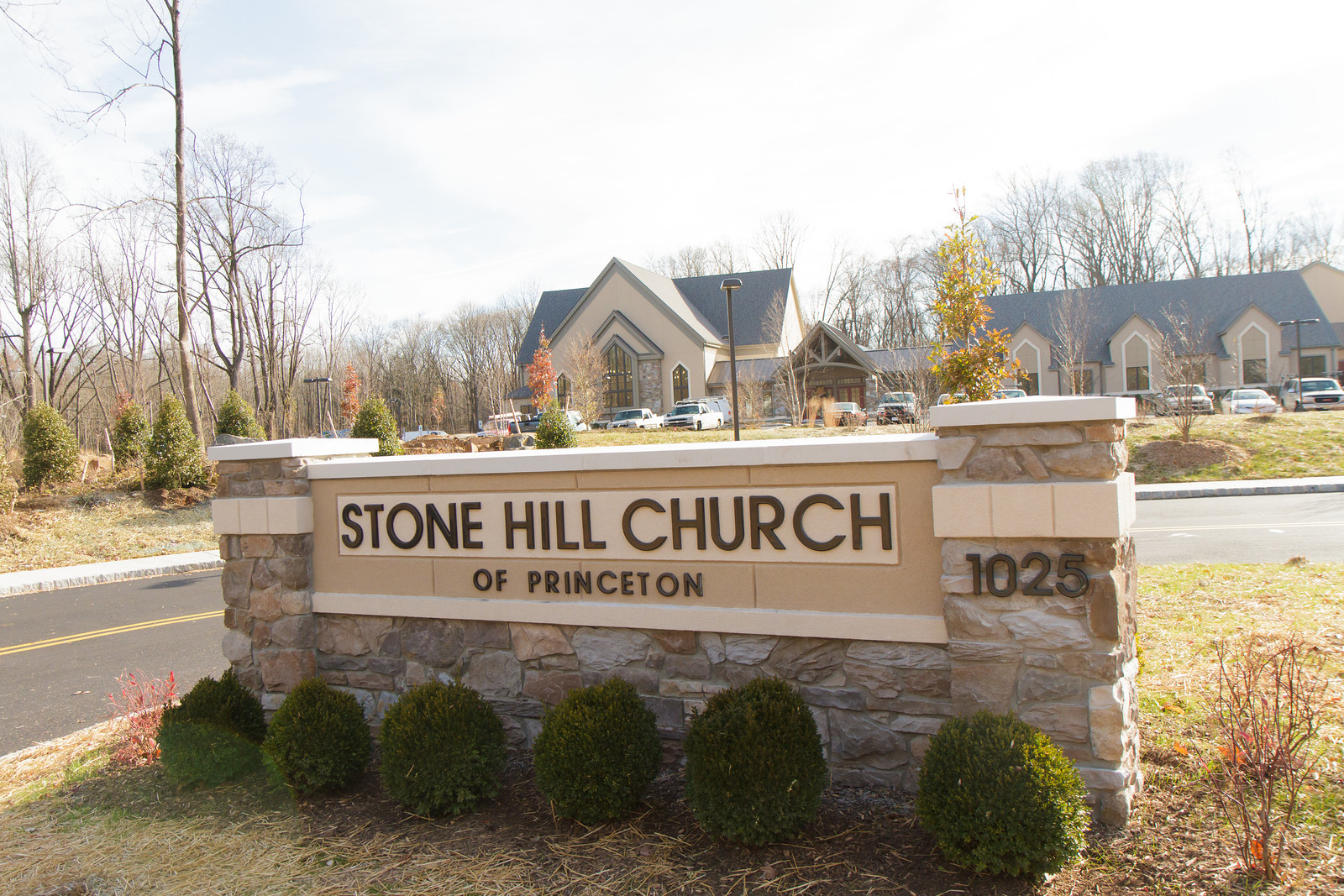

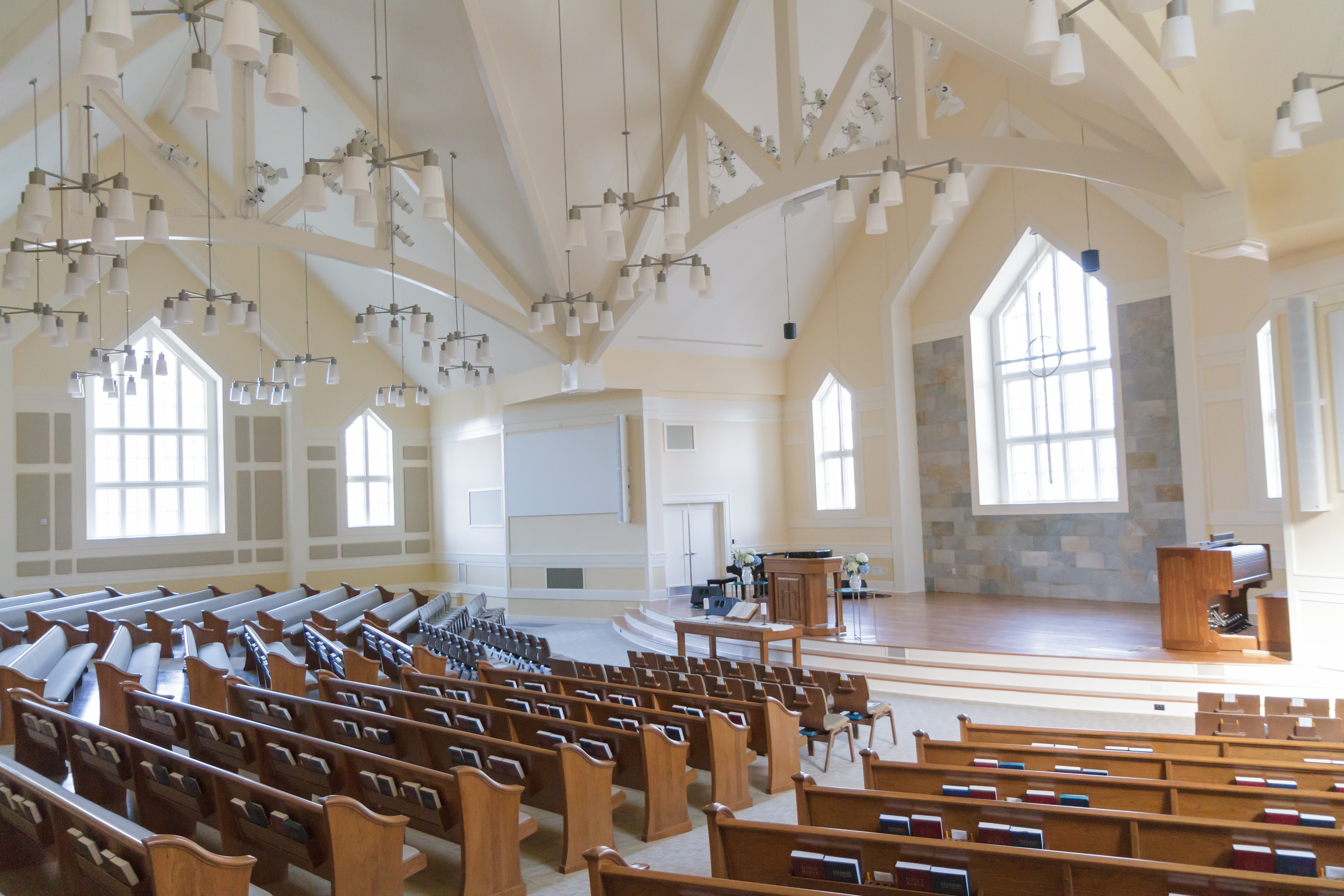
