= Donald B. Fullerton =

Dr. Donald B. Fullerton
- Rev. Dr. Donald B. Fullerton
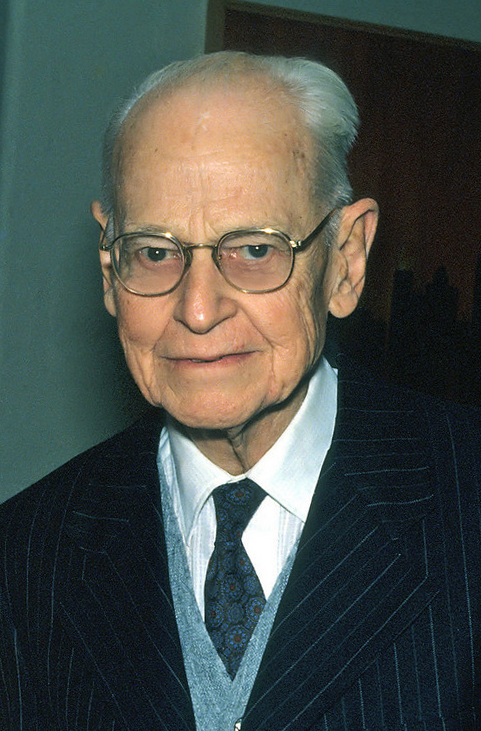
- Church: Stone Hill Church of Princeton, Princeton Christian Fellowship

Personal details
- Born: July 6, 1892 Brooklyn, New York
- Died: April 9, 1985 (aged 92) Lancaster, Pennsylvania
- Buried: Princeton Cemetery
- Denomination: Evangelical Christian
- Residence: Princeton, New Jersey
- Parents: Henry S. and Bessie B. Fullerton
- Occupation: Missionary and Campus Minister
- Education: Princeton University

Donald B. Fullerton (July 6, 1892 – April 9, 1985) was a Christian missionary and teacher who founded the Princeton Christian Fellowship, called the Princeton Evangelical Fellowship until 2017, and served with it from 1931 until 1980. He was noted for convincing many students at Princeton University of what he saw as the truth of the Christian faith. Arthur Glasser also credited his conversion to Dr. Fullerton, through hearing him speak at the Keswick Bible Conference. In addition to his evangelistic efforts, Dr. Fullerton was a major spiritual influence on many students including Paul Pressler, a major figure in the Conservative resurgence of the Southern Baptist Convention, and the noted Reformed theologian John Frame. He was a member of the Princeton University Class of 1913 and received an honorary Doctorate of Ministry from Grace Theological Seminary.

== Student, soldier, and missionary ==
=== Student days ===
Dr. Fullerton was the son of Henry S. Fullerton, a Wall Street Broker and country gentleman, and was a member of the Princeton University Class of 1913. At Princeton, Dr. Fullerton served as a counsellor for the Princeton Summer Camp, which served boys from poor neighborhoods in Princeton, Philadelphia, and New York City. The camp was funded by the Philadelphian Society, an evangelical society on campus whose later demise led to the founding of the Princeton Evangelical Fellowship. Fullerton was also a member of the English Dramatic Association, starring as Adriana in Shakespeare's The Comedy of Errors and receiving accolades as Abigail in Marlowe's The Jew of Malta. As Princeton was an all-male college at the time the female parts were played, in true Elizabethan fashion, by men. The review in the Daily Princetonian wrote:

The audience did not allow anything humorous to escape it; and once in a while it fairly howled over lines such as the one which announced that Abigail, quite mature as played by Fullerton, was but fourteen years of age. However, the performance was by no means marred by such unexpected outbursts, and after the first few minutes of the performance the audience even took Abigail seriously. Fullerton, in this pathetic role of the unfortunate heroine, had one of the most difficult parts to play, and he not only kept it from appearing ridiculous to his fellow students, which is in itself a feat, but he also played it well.

=== World War One ===
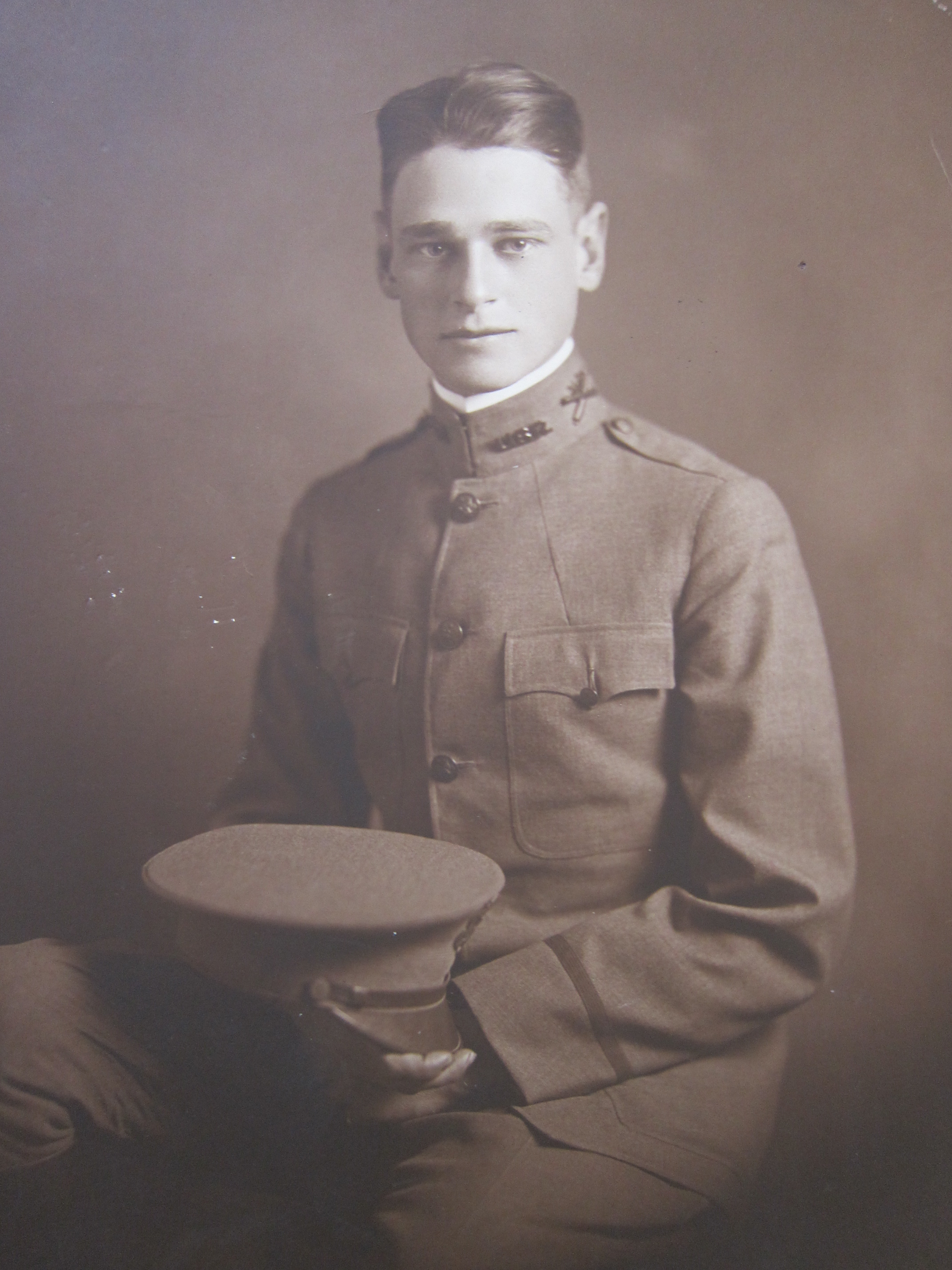
Donald Fullerton in WWI

After the entry of the United States into the First World War, Dr. Fullerton trained with a number of other Princeton alumni at Fort Myer. He served as a 2nd Lieutenant in the 313th Field Artillery whose six batteries were equipped with the famous French 75s. The unit participated in the Meuse-Argonne Offensive during which it was engaged in combat without rest or relief for 47 days and suffered 164 casualties, more than 11% of its soldiers. While serving with Battery A, three of Fullerton's men were killed on 14 October 1918 near Nantillois when a German shell hit their gun. While serving with Battery E two of his men were killed on 1 November 1918 by shell fragments in the fight near the Grande Carrée Ferme, north of Bantheville.

On 11 November 1918, the unit's last day in combat and the day of the Armistice, Fullerton intrigued to procure sufficient hay for the 313th Artillery's horses from a recalcitrant infantry officer:

It was on the 11th that we paid our first visit to Ferme Boulaine. Some one had discovered there a barn full of hay, and as our horse were short of forage we began to carry it over, but presently an infantry officer who had two horses stabled there placed a guard over it and refused to let us have it. We never found out exactly what his reason was, for surely there was hay enough for all of us, but when E Battery encountered the difficulty Lieutenant Fullerton solved it for the time being by arranging with the infantry officer to let each of his drivers carry over an arm load of hay. The infantry officer thoughtlessly forgot to ascertain how many drivers E Battery had or how they might be identified and as a result we drew all the hay we needed.

After the Armistice, he was promoted to 1st Lieutenant. Shortly after the war Fullerton wrote a chapter for the official history of his unit. He described the consequences of the campaign to the Meuse valley:

Small piles of stones were all that remained of what had been quaint stone villages in 1914. For miles, hills and valleys presented a continuous kaleidoscope of shell craters, trenches, dugouts and barbed wire entanglements. All canal locks and bridges were blown up. Rows of tree stumps lined the roads and canals where wonderful avenues had either been chopped away to open fields of fire or shot down by heavy artillery, leaving a mass of twisted splinters pointing in every direction.

He also wrote of the purpose of writing the history of the unit:

It may also give a faint idea of what we accomplished to those who were not so fortunate as we and who wonder why some of us don't talk. For their benefit be it said that there is a certain sanctity about a battlefield. Then, too, a soldier holds dear certain accomplishments but naturally is backward about mentioning them. There are other morbid memories he would like to forget and he does not like to prolong their existence in his own mind or start them in the minds of others.

=== Missionary work ===
In 1926 Fullerton decided to pursue missionary work, intending to go to the Belgian Congo, and trained at the Missionary Training Colony in London. Ultimately he went as a missionary with the Plymouth Brethren to the north west frontier of British India but was forced to return to the United States due to poor health.

== Leading the Princeton Evangelical Fellowship ==
=== Founding PEF ===
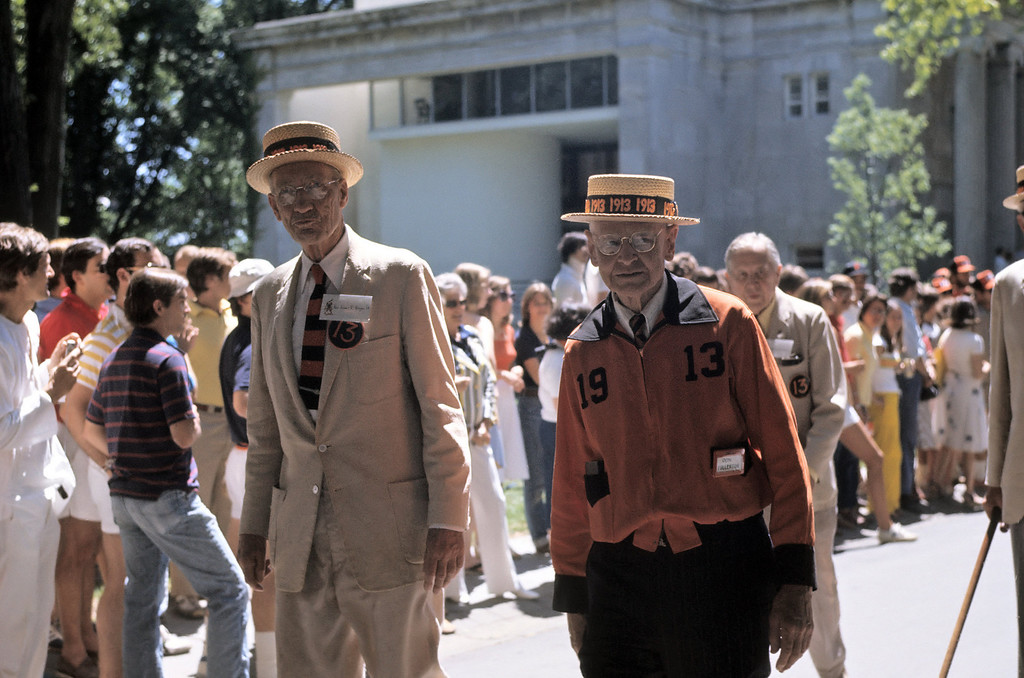
Dr. Fullerton (right) at the P-Rade (date uncertain, likely late 1970s).

Dr. Fullerton attempted to return to the mission field in 1929 despite his health troubles, sailing out on the RMS Mauretania. Before the ship sailed he prayed that the ship would be turned around if it was not God's will that he return to India. The Mauretania collided with a car float while still in New York harbor and the ship was forced to return to port. Fullerton disembarked, never to return overseas, and spent a short time teaching at J. Oliver Buswell's National Bible Institute in New York. In 1930 the Philadelphian Society, which had served as the focus of evangelical student life at Princeton University since 1825, went defunct amid the Fundamentalist–Modernist Controversy. In 1931 the parent of a Princeton student, worried over the lack of evangelical ministry at the university, called Dr. Fullerton to ask him to start Bible classes with students, classes he would continue into the 1970s.

In 1937 the Bible classes led by Dr. Fullerton developed into a formal student organization, the Princeton Evangelical Fellowship. The first undergraduate president of the PEF, Archibald Fletcher of the Princeton Class of 1938, wrote to The Daily Princetonian that:

The purpose of this Fellowship shall be to provide an opportunity for students at Princeton University to enjoy Christian fellowship one with another, to bear united witness to the faith of its members in the whole Bible as the inspired Word of God and to encourage other students to take, with them, a definite stand for Christ on the Campus.

=== Ministry years ===
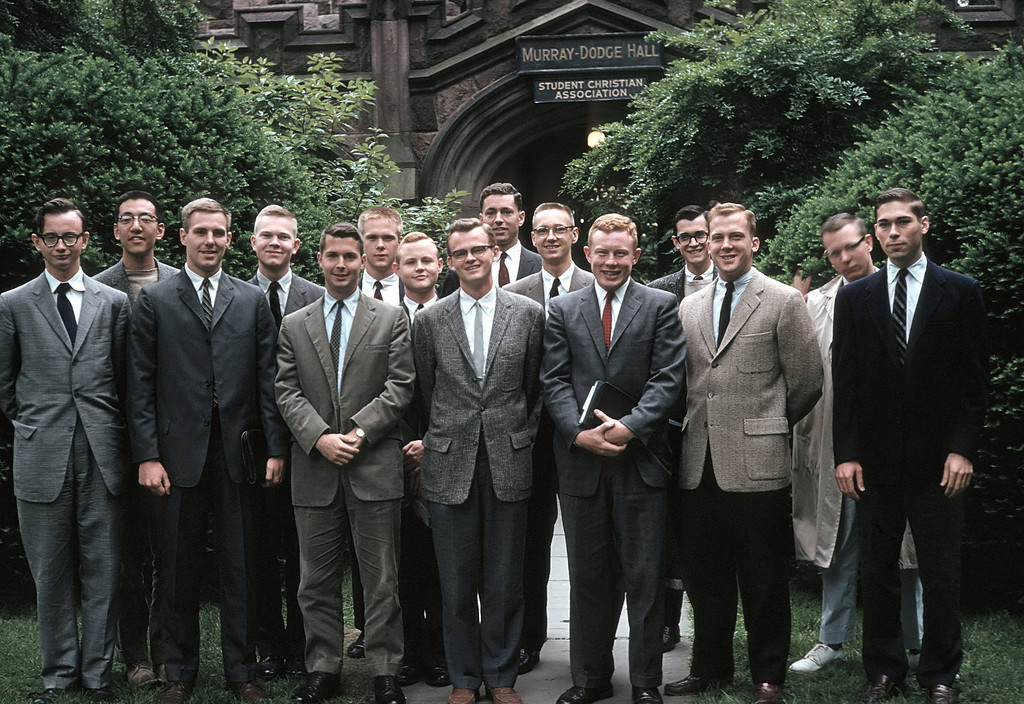
The PEF in 1960 (L-R): William Bryant '60, Chi-Yu King '61, Steve Johnson '60, Don Youngren '61, Ron Fisher '60, Hank Bryant '63, John Frame '61, Jim Renick '60, Suthy MacLean '58, Ken Petzinger '63, Bob Shade '60, Ron Furst '63, Bruce Higgins '60, Bart Campbell '62, Jerry Butler '60. Six became missionaries and one a theologian.

Dr. Fullerton moved to Princeton in 1953 to fully devote himself to the work of the PEF. Prior to that time he served in other ministry contexts, including teaching Bible classes to medical students in New York City and serving as the associate pastor of the West End Chapel in Plainfield. After the founding of Westerly Road Church. in 1956 Fullerton became a member and began a long relationship between the church and the PEF.

John Frame, a noted Presbyterian theologian, has written at length of the influence of the PEF, Westerly Road Church, and especially Dr. Fullerton on his life through his time at Princeton in the late '50s and early '60s. He writes of Fullerton:

Dr. Fullerton was constantly about his Father's business. When he met a new student, it usually did not take more than thirty seconds for him to get on the subject of Jesus and the gospel. Then Fullerton would talk with the student as long as possible and necessary, to discern his spiritual condition, to present the gospel, to answer questions, to urge a decision. When we students sought to lead others to Christ, our main strategy was usually to maneuver them into a situation where they could have a good talk with Dr. Fullerton. Not every student who talked with him was converted, but many were. It seemed to us that, humanly speaking, if anyone could get the gospel through to a Princeton student, it was Dr. Fullerton... the greatest part of [PEF] was the godly example of Donald B. Fullerton. He was not a perfect man, but I am yet today an imitator of his, since he imitated Jesus.

=== Retirement ===
Dr. Fullerton continued teaching Bible classes until 1975 and attended prayer meetings with the Princeton Evangelical Fellowship through 1980. He died at the age of 92 in Lancaster, Pennsylvania, and is buried in the Princeton Cemetery. Philippians 3:10 is referenced on his gravestone: "That I may know him, and the power of his resurrection, and the fellowship of his sufferings, being made conformable unto his death." His legacy continues through the work of the Princeton Christian Fellowship.
