= Princeton Christian Fellowship =

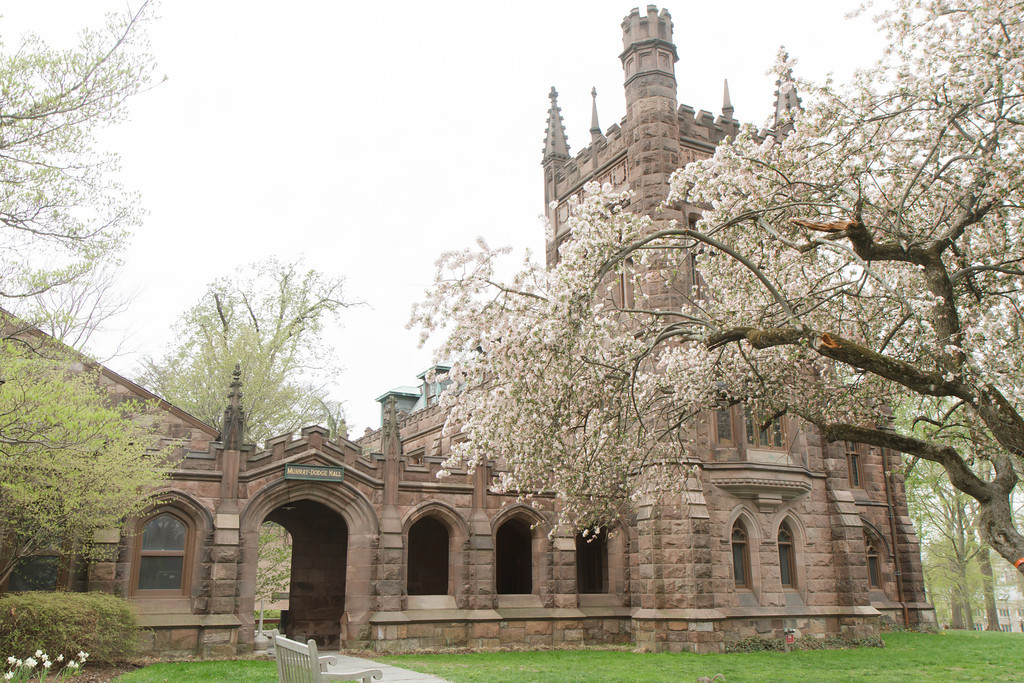
- Murray-Dodge Hall, in which PCF has held meetings since the 1930s.
- Founder: Donald B. Fullerton
- Registration no.: 22-1903095
- Purpose: Religious instruction
- Headquarters: 24 Moore St., Princeton, NJ
- Coordinates: 40.347940°N 74.657938°W
- Executive Secretary: Chris Sallade
- Website: pcfprinceton.org
- Formerly called: Princeton Evangelical Fellowship

The Princeton Christian Fellowship (PCF), formerly the Princeton Evangelical Fellowship (PEF), is a nondenominational Christian ministry at Princeton University whose purpose is "to help undergraduate and graduate students ... grow as believers and followers of Jesus Christ ... [and] to let the rest of the University community know the full message of Christianity so that others can come to believe and have faith in Jesus Christ." Founded in 1931 by Dr. Donald B. Fullerton, a member of the Princeton University Class of 1913, the PCF is one of the oldest campus ministries of its type, predating the founding of Cru and Intervarsity by a decade or more. PCF is one of the largest student organizations at Princeton University, and is currently led by the Rev. Chris Sallade, a member of the Princeton Class of 1994.

== Early history ==
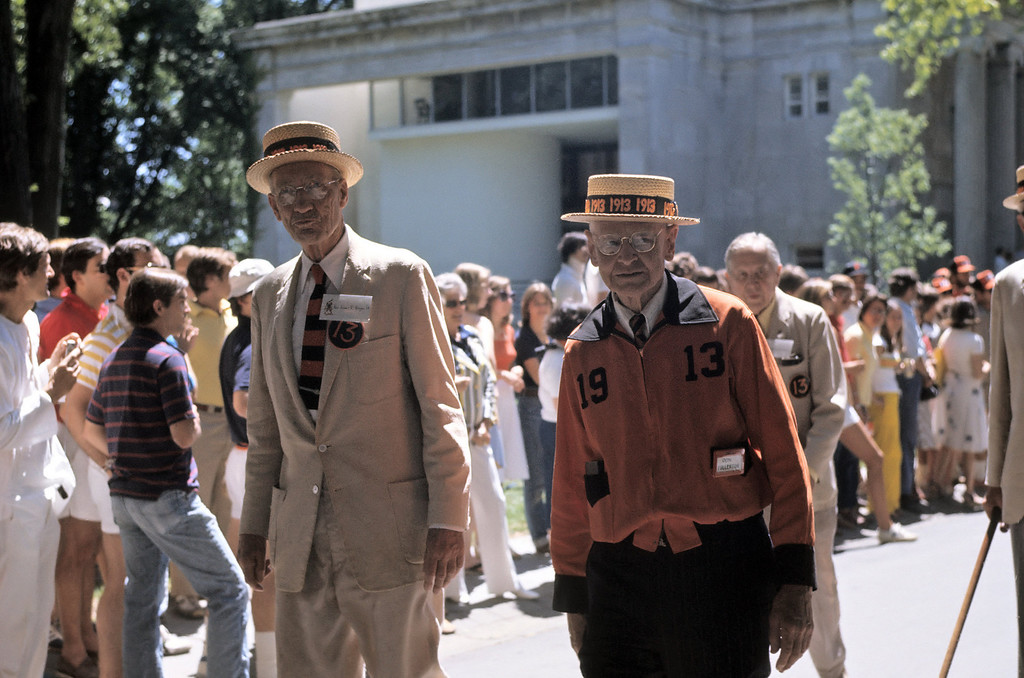
Dr. Fullerton (right), the founder of the Princeton Evangelical Fellowship, at the P-Rade (date uncertain, likely late 1970s).

From 1825 until its demise amid controversy in 1930 the Philadelphian Society was the center of Evangelical religious life on campus. This left a lack of organized evangelical ministry at Princeton and the next year a friend of Donald Fullerton called him worried over the hard time his son was having spiritually as a student. Dr. Fullerton had previously served as a Plymouth Brethren missionary on the northwest frontier of British India, the border regions of modern-day Pakistan and Afghanistan, but was forced off the mission field by ill health. He made an attempt to return to the mission field in 1929, sailing out on the RMS Mauretania. He prayed that God would turn the ship around if it was not His will that he return to the mission field. While still in New York harbor the Mauretania collided with a car float forcing a return to dock and signaling to Dr. Fullerton that his days of overseas service were at an end.

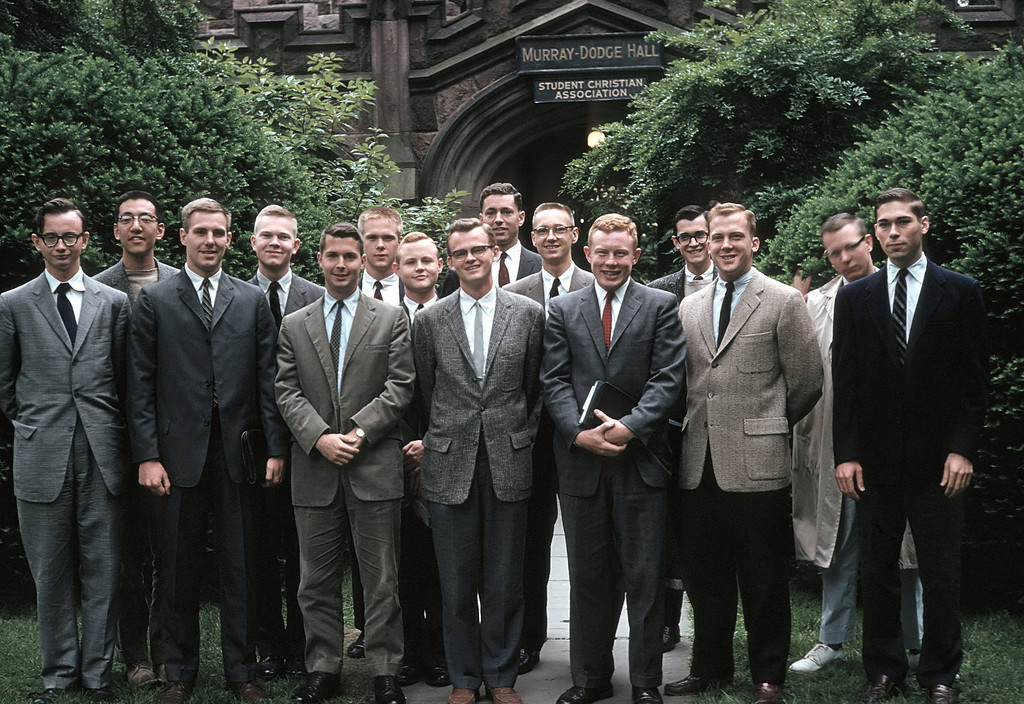
The PCF in 1960 (L-R): William Bryant '60, Ray Chao '61, Steve Johnson '60, Don Youngren '61, Ron Fisher '60, Hank Bryant '63, John Frame '61, Jim Renick '60, Suthy MacLean '58, Ken Petzinger '63, Bob Shade '60, Ron Furst '63, Bruce Higgins '60, Bart Campbell '62, Jerry Butler '60. Six became missionaries and one a theologian.

This enabled Dr. Fullerton to respond to the request of his friend by starting to hold Bible classes on the campus, which replaced the defunct Philadelphian Society and which he would continue for fifty years. These informal Bible classes grew into a formal organization in 1937, with PCF's first undergraduate president, A.G. Fletcher Jr. a member of the Princeton Class of 1938, announcing:

A group of us have felt for a number of years the need on this Campus of a society with a fundamental Christian position ... [we] feel that the fine Christian tradition on which Princeton was founded is not entirely dead today and that there are still many undergraduates in the University whose senses are awake to the higher, eternal values in life, and who would welcome an opportunity to strengthen and reaffirm these convictions in a collective way through congenial fellowship with others holding similar views ... We wish to emphasize that the P. E. F. was not formed in opposition to any of the religious organizations already existing on the Campus. Our intention has never been to oppose, but rather to supplement these other programs by supplying elements which we feel have been neglected.

A notable early member of PCF was Jack Whitcomb, led to faith as a freshman by Dr. Fullerton and a leading young earth creationist. In 1947, the same year the PCF held its first alumni reunion, the fellowship hosted a showing of The God of Creation, a film created by the Moody Institute. One member of the audience of two hundred was Albert Einstein to whom the young Dr. Whitcomb handed a Gospel tract.

Another notable PCF alumnus from its early decades is the noted Reformed theologian John Frame a member of the Princeton Class of 1960. He said of his time in the fellowship that:

Fullerton and PEF cared deeply about people, spending hours in mutual prayer, exhortation, counseling, gospel witness ... And they made me a much better follower of Jesus. I will never regret being part of this semi-Arminian, dispensationalist, separatist, tee-totaling, semi-victorious life, pietistic, biblicistic group called PEF. And the greatest part of that experience was the godly example of Donald B. Fullerton. He was not a perfect man, but I am yet today an imitator of his, since he imitated Jesus.

== Growth and Change ==
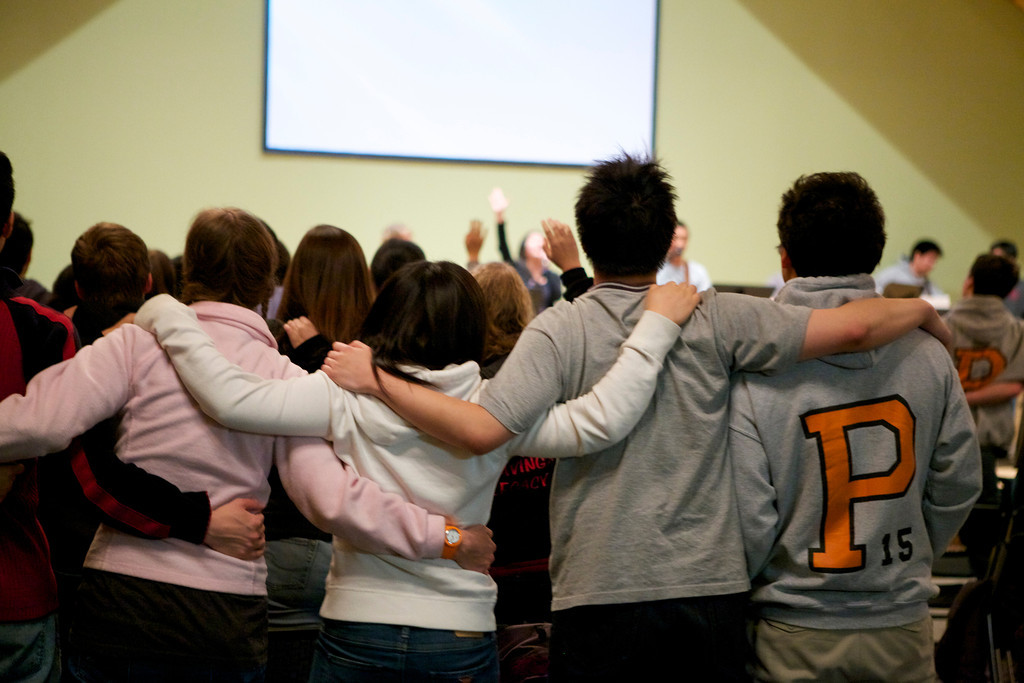
Students on the 2012 Winter Retreat.

The fellowship has grown steadily over time, with under 30 members in 1959, up to 70 by the 1978, and 150 by the late 90s. It now includes a dedicated graduate student ministry, the Graduate Princeton Christian Fellowship. PCF's members have included several Princeton University valedictorians, salutatorians, and two young alumni trustees among recipients of many other university awards. According to one source PCF's alumni include "prominent seminary professors, scientists, denominational leaders, influential authors, as well as missionaries in more than twenty-five countries. As an independent group from a single university, the PCF has contributed more leaders to the Christian world than probably any other Christian college group."

PCF has a long tradition of baptizing students on Easter Sunday morning in conjunction with other campus ministries and under the authority of Stone Hill Church of Princeton. The fellowship also has long associations with members of the Princeton faculty, most notably the work of Dr. James Rankin in mentoring students and playing piano and keyboard with the fellowship's worship team.

Over its more than eighty years of existence the PCF has seen many changes. The hymn books of earlier years gave way to guitars and contemporary worship music. Suits and ties have given way to shorts and flip-flops, and the introduction of coeducation to Princeton in 1969 ended the days when the fellowship was exclusively male. Despite the many changes over the decades PCF continues to be cited by students and alumni as a principal life influence. Dr. Justin Hastings of the Princeton Class of 2001 wrote at the end of his senior year:

The Princeton Evangelical Fellowship was the reason I came to Princeton ... Now, four years later, PEF is most assuredly the best thing to happen to me at Princeton ... PEF has prepared me morally and spiritually for life after Princeton, much more so than any class I've taken here over the past four years.

In the fall of 2017 the ministry changed its name to Princeton Christian Fellowship, due to the perception that the term 'evangelical' had too much of a political connotation rather than a theological one, with Boyce stating "There might be certain assumptions that all evangelicals are Republicans".

== Notable alumni ==
- John C. Whitcomb
- Harry A. Hoffner
- John Frame
- Samuel T. Logan
