= Esther Meek =

American philosopher (born 1953)

Esther Lightcap Meek is an American philosopher and a Professor of Philosophy emeritus at Geneva College in Western Pennsylvania. She is a Fellow Scholar of the Fujimura Institute with artist Makoto Fujimura, an Associate Fellow with the Kirby Laing Center for Public Theology, and a member of the Polanyi Society.

== Early life and education ==
Esther Meek was born in Philadelphia, living there and then in the Philadelphia's western suburbs, Broomall and Newtown Square. She attended Marple Newtown School District, graduating in 1971.

Meek received her B.A. from Cedarville University in 1975 working especially with Professor James M. Grier. Transferring there after a year studying chemistry at Lebanon Valley College, she majored in interdisciplinary studies/philosophy. She received her M.A. in humanities/philosophy from Western Kentucky University in 1976. In 1976, Meek completed a semester of study at Westminster Theological Seminary, working with theologian John Frame, a key influence in her subsequent philosophical work.

Beginning in 1977, Meek completed a Ph.D. at Temple University in 1985. Trained at Temple in the Anglo-American philosophical tradition, a chance discovery of the work of scientist-turned-philosopher Michael Polanyi, opened her philosophical path forward. She studied with visiting professor Marjorie Grene while at Temple. Meek's 1983 Dissertation was “Contact with Reality: An Examination of Michael Polanyi's Epistemic Realism,” supervised by Joseph Margolis.

Meek continued theological study while teaching at Covenant Theological Seminary.

== Teaching ==
Meek was Grier's grader while at Cedarville University. She began her teaching career as a Graduate Assistant for both her MA and PhD Programs. She taught logic and philosophy part-time at University of Southwest Louisiana, at Fontbonne University, Covenant Theological Seminary, and St. Louis University.

While at Covenant Theological Seminary, Meek developed her Covenant Epistemology, offering this as a course in partnership with theologian Mike Williams, beginning in 2000. Meek joined the Faculty at Geneva College in 2004, joining philosopher Robert Frazier, to offer the college's philosophy program. She also joined and later coordinated one of Geneva's signature core interdisciplinary humanities courses. She retired in 2021 as Professor emeritus.

Following the 2011 publication of her Loving to Know, Meek served as Visiting Professor of Apologetics for Redeemer Theological Seminary in Dallas, TX, until its termination in 2016. She offers courses for Theopolis Institute, The Seattle School of Theology and Psychology, and Regent College.

== Work ==
Meek produced for President Bryan Chapell two volumes of reworkings of his sermons into small group studies. Meek's first book she wrote with Donald J. MacNair: The Practices of a Healthy Church: Biblical Strategies for Vibrant Church Life and Ministry (P&R, 1999).

Meek's first book, Longing to Know, was published in 2003. A majority of her work to date engages epistemology, which is the philosophical study of how knowing works. She titles her own epistemic proposals, “covenant epistemology.”

Meek's books include: Longing to Know: The Philosophy of Knowledge for Ordinary People (Brazos, 2003); Loving to Know: Introducing Covenant Epistemology (Cascade, 2011); A Little Manual for Knowing (Cascade, 2014); and Contact With Reality: Michael Polanyi's Realism and Why It Matters (Cascade, 2017). An earlier book she coauthored with Church Expert Donald J. MacNair: The Practices of a Healthy Church (P&R, 1999). Her current book project is a series, Doorways, in which each small volume will work out covenant epistemology's application in a specific discipline such as art, business, therapy, and education. At Cascade Books, Meek works especially with editor Robin Parry.

== Recognition ==
Geneva College awarded Meek Outstanding Scholar of the Year in 2011.

In 2016, she received Southeastern Baptist Theological Seminary's Award For Outstanding Academic Achievement.

== Associations ==
Meek is a member of the Michael Polanyi Society, contributing papers and publications to this Society of Explorers. She is a Fujimura Institute Fellow Scholar, working with artist Makoto Fujimura to offer scholarship designed to nurture artists in their work. She is an Associate Fellow with the Kirby Laing Centre for Public Theology in Cambridge, UK.
