= John Frame (theologian) =

American theologian and academic (born 1939)

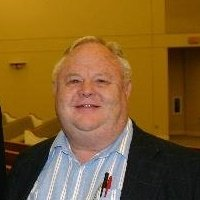
- 2009
- Born: April 8, 1939 (age 87); Pittsburgh, Pennsylvania, U.S.
- Occupations: Theologian, author
- Spouse: Mary Grace
- Children: 2

Philosophical work
- Era: Late 20th and early 21st centuries
- Region: US
- Language: English
- Main interests: Calvinism, Cornelius Van Til, epistemology, presuppositional apologetics, ethics, systematic theology
- Notable works: Theology of Lordship series, Van Til: The Theologian, Introduction to Presuppositional Apologetics
- Notable ideas: Multiperspectivalism

John McElphatrick Frame (born April 8, 1939) is a retired American Christian philosopher and Calvinist theologian especially noted for his work in epistemology and presuppositional apologetics, systematic theology, and ethics. He is one of the foremost interpreters and critics of the thought of Cornelius Van Til.

== Biography ==
Frame was born in Pittsburgh, Pennsylvania and became a Christian at the age of 13 through the ministry of Beverly Heights Presbyterian Church, a congregation of the United Presbyterian Church of North America in Pittsburgh. He graduated from Princeton University, where he was involved in the Princeton Evangelical Fellowship (PEF) and Westerly Road Church. The PEF and Westerly Road had a profound impact on forming Frame's faith and theology. He says of their impact:

I owe much to PEF ... Fullerton and PEF cared deeply about people, spending hours in mutual prayer, exhortation, counseling, gospel witness. I never experienced that depth of fellowship in any Reformed church or institution ... So I am not much impressed by people who want to set up an adversary relation between "Reformed" and "evangelical." Today, Reformed writers often disparage evangelical ministries as circuses, as clubs that will do anything at all to gain members, who pander to the basest lusts of modern culture. That was not true of PEF, or of Westerly Road Church ... PEF would never have imagined the effect their ministry had on me: they turned me into a Reformed ecumenist!

Frame received degrees from Princeton University (A.B.), Westminster Theological Seminary (B.D.), and Yale University (AM and M.Phil, as well as beginning work on a doctoral dissertation). He received an honorary doctorate of divinity in 2003 from Belhaven College. He has served on the faculty of Westminster Theological Seminary as professor of Systemic Theology and Philosophy. He was also a founding faculty member of their California campus; as of 2019, he is an emeritus faculty member at Reformed Theological Seminary in Orlando, Florida.

He is an ordained minister in the Presbyterian Church in America.

== Relations to other scholars: polemics and critical reviews ==
Frame is known for his critical view of historical modes of theology, including his criticism of such scholars as David F. Wells, Donald Bloesch, Mark Noll, George Marsden, D.G. Hart, Richard Muller, and Michael Horton. Particularly notable amongst Frame's critical analyses is "Machen's Warrior Children", originally published in Alister E. McGrath and Evangelical Theology: a Dynamic Engagement (Paternoster Press, 2003). More recently, Frame reviewed Horton's book Christless Christianity with a similar analysis. In 1998, he debated then librarian D.G. Hart in a student-organized discussion of the regulative principle of worship.

== Multiperspectival epistemology ==
Frame has elaborated a Christian epistemology in his 1987 work The Doctrine of the Knowledge of God. In this work, he develops what he calls triperspectivalism or multiperspectivalism which says that in every act of knowing, the knower is in constant contact with three things (or "perspectives") – the knowing subject himself, the object of knowledge, and the standard or criteria by which knowledge is attained. He argues that each perspective is interrelated to the others in such a fashion that, in knowing one of these, one actually knows the other two, also. His student and collaborator Vern Poythress has further developed this idea with respect to science and theology. Reformed theologian Meredith Kline wrote a critique of this view, explaining that Poythress and Frame had used multiperspectivalism in ways that had led to what he considered incorrect conclusions in regards to the relation of Kline's position and Greg L. Bahnsen's on covenant theology (more specifically theonomy).

== Presuppositions ==
As a former student of Van Til, Frame is supporter of the presuppositionalist school of Christian apologetics. He defines a presupposition as follows:

A presupposition is a belief that takes precedence over another and therefore serves as a criterion for another. An ultimate presupposition is a belief over which no other takes precedence. For a Christian, the content of Scripture must serve as his ultimate presupposition. ... This doctrine is merely the outworking of the lordship of God in the area of human thought. It merely applies the doctrine of scriptural infallibility to the realm of knowing.

== Rationalism and irrationalism in non-Christian thought ==
Frame, developing the thought of his mentor Cornelius Van Til, has asserted in both his Apologetics to the Glory of God and his Cornelius Van Til: An Analysis of His Thought, that all non-Christian thought can be categorized as the ebb and flow of rationalism and irrationalism.

=== Rationalism ===
In this context Frame defines rationalism as any attempt to establish the finite human mind as the ultimate standard of truth and falsity. This establishing of the autonomous intellect occurs within the context of rejecting God's revelation of himself in both nature and the Bible; a rationalist, in this sense, states that the human mind is able to fully and exhaustively explain reality.

Yet, when Frame speaks of "exhaustive explanations" he does not mean these systems seek omniscience; rather, he means that the history of non-Christian thought (though, admittedly, his focus is Western philosophy) is the history of various attempts to construct systems that account for everything (a distinctive metaphysic, epistemology and value theory).

According to Frame, examples of attempts to explain reality are found in Plato and Aristotle's form/matter dualism; the debate between the nominalists and the realists over the status of universals and particulars, and the "all is ... [fire, water, atoms, etc]" of the pre-Socratics. More examples would include Descartes' mind/body dualism, Spinoza's God or nature, and Leibniz's monadology, Plotinus' "The One" and his teaching on emanation, the British empiricists' attempts to limit knowledge and possibility to that which can be empirically verified, Kant's worlds of the noumena and the phenomena, and Hegel's dialectic.

== Awards and recognition ==
Belhaven College awarded Frame an honorary Doctor of Divinity in 2003.

== Personal life ==
Frame married Mary Grace Cummings in 1984, and has two sons and three stepchildren; Mary died on October 9, 2022. As of 2024, he lives in Orlando, Florida.

== Selected works ==
- Introduction to Presuppositional Apologetics Part 1 & 2
- Van Til: The Theologian, 1976 ISBN 0-916034-02-X
- Medical Ethics, 1988 ISBN 0-87552-261-0
- Perspectives on the Word of God: An Introduction to Christian Ethics, 1990 ISBN 0-8010-3557-0
- Evangelical Reunion, 1991 ISBN 0-8010-3560-0
- Apologetics to the Glory of God, 1994 ISBN 0-87552-243-2
- Cornelius Van Til: An Analysis of his Thought, 1995 ISBN 0-87552-245-9
- Worship in Spirit and Truth, 1996 ISBN 0-87552-242-4
- Contemporary Worship Music: A Biblical Defense, 1997 ISBN 0-87552-212-2
- No Other God: A Response to Open Theism, 2001 ISBN 0-87552-185-1
- Salvation Belongs To The Lord: An Introduction To Systematic Theology, 2006 ISBN 1-59638-018-7
- Systematic Theology: An Introduction to Christian Belief, 2013 ISBN 1-59638-217-1
- A History of Western Philosophy and Theology, 2015 ISBN 978-1-62995-084-6
- Theology of My Life: A Theological and Apologetic Memoir, 2017 ISBN 978-1-5326-1378-4

=== Theology of Lordship series ===
- The Doctrine of the Knowledge of God, 1987 ISBN 0-87552-262-9
- The Doctrine of God, 2002 ISBN 0-87552-263-7
- The Doctrine of the Christian Life, 2008 ISBN 978-0-87552-796-3
- The Doctrine of the Word of God, 2010 ISBN 978-0-87552-264-7
