= Oswald Veblen =

American mathematician (1880–1960)

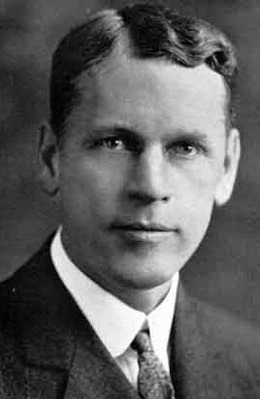
- Oswald Veblen (photograph c. 1915)
- Born: June 24, 1880; Decorah, Iowa, U.S.
- Died: August 10, 1960 (aged 80); Brooklin, Maine, U.S.
- Education: University of Iowa; Harvard University; University of Chicago
- Known for: Veblen function Veblen hierarchy Veblen ordinal Veblen's theorem Veblen–Young theorem Veblen–Wedderburn systems Fixed-point lemma for normal functions
- Scientific career
- Workplaces: Princeton University; Institute for Advanced Study
- Thesis: A System of Axioms for Geometry (1903)
- Doctoral advisor: E. H. Moore
- Doctoral students: J. W. Alexander; H. Roy Brahana; Alonzo Church; Philip Franklin; Wallace Givens; Harold Hotelling; Howard H. Mitchell; Robert Lee Moore; Tracy Thomas; J. H. C. Whitehead

Oswald Veblen (June 24, 1880 – August 10, 1960) was an American mathematician, geometer and topologist, whose work found application in atomic physics and the theory of relativity. He proved the Jordan curve theorem in 1905; while this was long considered the first rigorous proof of the theorem, many now also consider Camille Jordan's original proof rigorous.

== Early life ==
Veblen was born in Decorah, Iowa. His parents were Andrew Anderson Veblen (1848–1932), Professor of Physics at the University of Iowa, and Kirsti (Hougen) Veblen (1851–1908). Veblen's uncle was Thorstein Veblen, noted economist and sociologist.

Oswald went to school in Iowa City. He did his undergraduate studies at the University of Iowa, where he received an AB in 1898, and Harvard University, where he was awarded a second BA in 1900. For his graduate studies, he went to study mathematics at the University of Chicago, where he obtained a PhD in 1903. His dissertation, A System of Axioms for Geometry was written under the supervision of E. H. Moore. During World War I, Veblen served first as a captain, later as a major in the United States Army.

== Career ==
Veblen taught mathematics at Princeton University from 1905 to 1932. In 1926, he was named Henry B. Fine Professor of Mathematics. In 1932, he helped organize the Institute for Advanced Study in Princeton, resigning his professorship to become the first professor at the Institute that same year. He kept his professorship at the Institute until he was made emeritus in 1950.

During his years in Princeton, Veblen and his wife, Elizabeth M D Richardson, accumulated land along the Princeton Ridge. In 1957 they donated 82 acres (33 ha) to establish the Herrontown Woods Arboretum, the first and one of the largest nature preserves in Princeton, New Jersey.

Veblen was a Plenary Speaker of the ICM in 1928 in Bologna and in 1936 in Oslo.

Veblen died in Brooklin, Maine, in 1960 at age 80. After his death the American Mathematical Society created an award in his name, called the Oswald Veblen Prize in Geometry. It is awarded every three years, and is the most prestigious award in recognition of outstanding research in geometry.

== Accomplishments ==
During his career, Veblen made important contributions in topology and in projective and differential geometries, including results important in modern physics. He introduced the Veblen axioms for projective geometry and proved the Veblen–Young theorem. He introduced the Veblen functions of ordinals and used an extension of them to define the small and large Veblen ordinals. In World War II he was involved in overseeing ballistics work at the Aberdeen Proving Ground that involved early modern computing machines, in particular supporting the proposal for creation of the pioneering ENIAC electronic digital computer. He also published a paper in 1912 on the four-color conjecture.

Veblen was elected to the American Philosophical Society in 1912, the United States National Academy of Sciences in 1919, and the American Academy of Arts and Sciences in 1923.

== Personal life ==
In 1908, he married Elizabeth Richardson, the sister of British physicist Owen Willans Richardson and sister-in-law of American physicist Clinton Joseph Davisson. Steven G. Krantz noted that the tradition of mathematical teas was started by Veblen at Princeton in the 1920s, as an outgrowth of enjoying his British wife Elizabeth's teas.

== Veblen Research Instructorship ==
The Veblen Research Instructorship is a three-year position offered by the Department of Mathematics at Princeton University and the Institute for Advanced Study. This position was established in 1998 and offered each year to outstanding candidates in pure and applied mathematics who have received their PhD within the last three years.

The Veblen instructors are Members of the Institute for Advanced Study and regular faculty members at Princeton University. The first and third year of the instructorship are spent at Princeton University and carry regular teaching responsibilities. The second year is spent at the Institute and dedicated to independent research of the instructor's choice.

== Books by O. Veblen ==
- Introduction to infinitesimal analysis; functions of one real variable with N. J. Lennes (John Wiley & Sons, 1907)
- Projective geometry with John Wesley Young (Ginn and Co., Vol. 1, 1910; Vol. 2, 1918)
- Analysis Situs (American Mathematical Society, 1922; 2nd edn. 1931)
- Invariants of Quadratic Differential Forms (Cambridge University Press, 1927)
- The Foundations of Differential Geometry with J. H. C. Whitehead (Cambridge University Press, 1932)
- Projektive Relativitätstheorie (Springer Verlag, 1933)

== See also ==
- Hughes plane
- Finite geometry
- Ordered geometry
- Hall plane of order 9
- Herrontown Woods Arboretum
