= Veblen ordinal =

In mathematics, the Veblen ordinals is either of two Large countable ordinals:

- The Small Veblen ordinal
- The Large Veblen ordinal

They are named after Oswald Veblen.

== See also ==
- Veblen function
