= Video feedback =

Loop delay that occurs when a video camera is pointed at its own playback video monitor

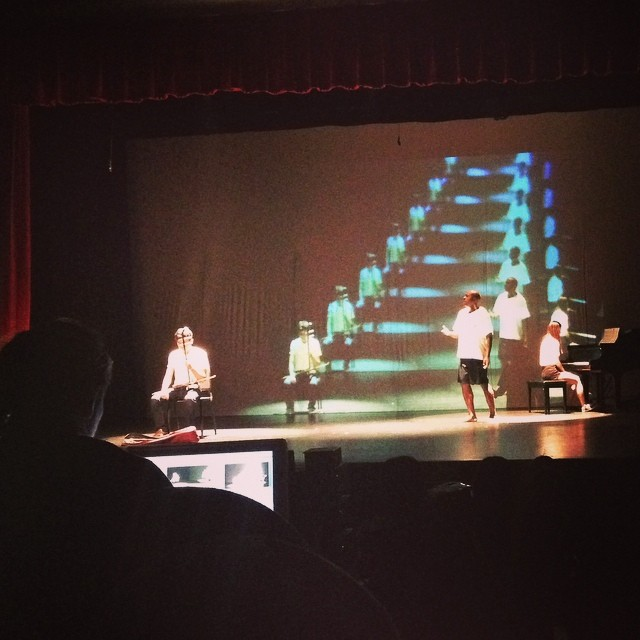
Video feedback

Video feedback is the process that starts and continues when a video camera is pointed at its own playback video monitor. The loop delay from camera to display back to camera is at least one video frame time, due to the input and output scanning processes; it can be more if there is more processing in the loop.

== History ==
In the 1960s early examples of video feedback art became introduced into the psychedelic art scene in New York City. Nam June Paik is often cited as the first video artist; he had clips of video feedback on display in New York City at the Greenwich Cafe in the mid 1960s.

Early video feedback works were produced by media artist experimenters on the East and West Coasts of the United States in the late 1960s and early 1970s. Video feedback artists Steina and Woody Vasulka, with Richard Lowenberg and others, formed The Kitchen, which was located in the kitchen of a broken-down hotel in lower Manhattan; while Skip Sweeney and others founded Video Free America in San Francisco, to nurture their video art and feedback experiments.

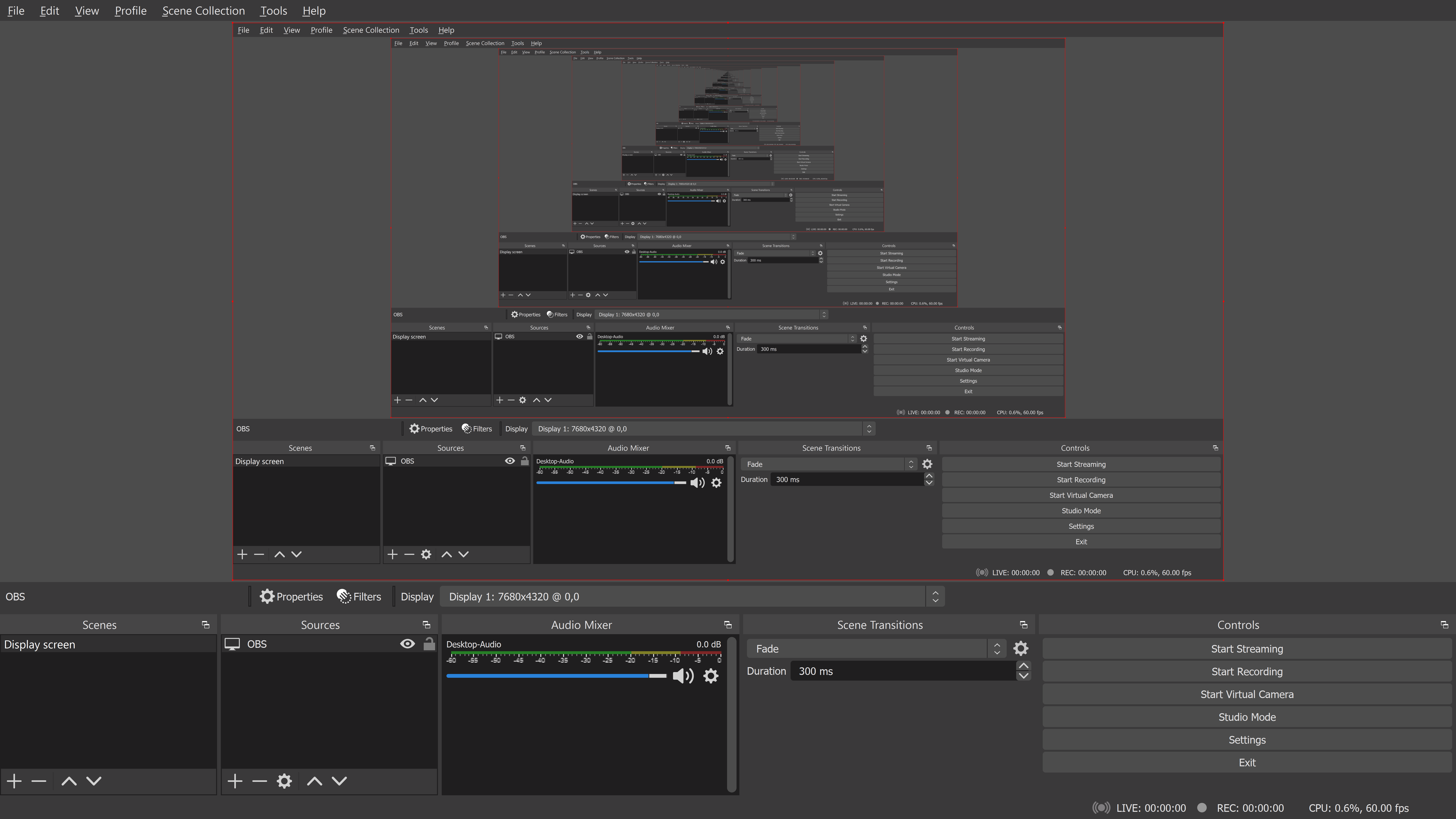
Droste effect recursion in OBS, a computer streaming and recording program

Video feedback is mentioned in David Sohn's 1970 book Film, the Creative Eye. This book was part of the base curriculum for Richard Lederer of St. Paul's School in Concord, New Hampshire, when he made video feedback part of an English curriculum in his 1970s course Creative Eye in Film. Several students in this class participated regularly in the making and recording of video feedback. Sony had released the VuMax series of recording video cameras and manually "hand-looped" video tape decks by this time which did two things: it increased the resolution of the video image, which improved picture quality, and it made video tape recording technology available to the general public for the first time and allowed for such video experimentation by anyone.

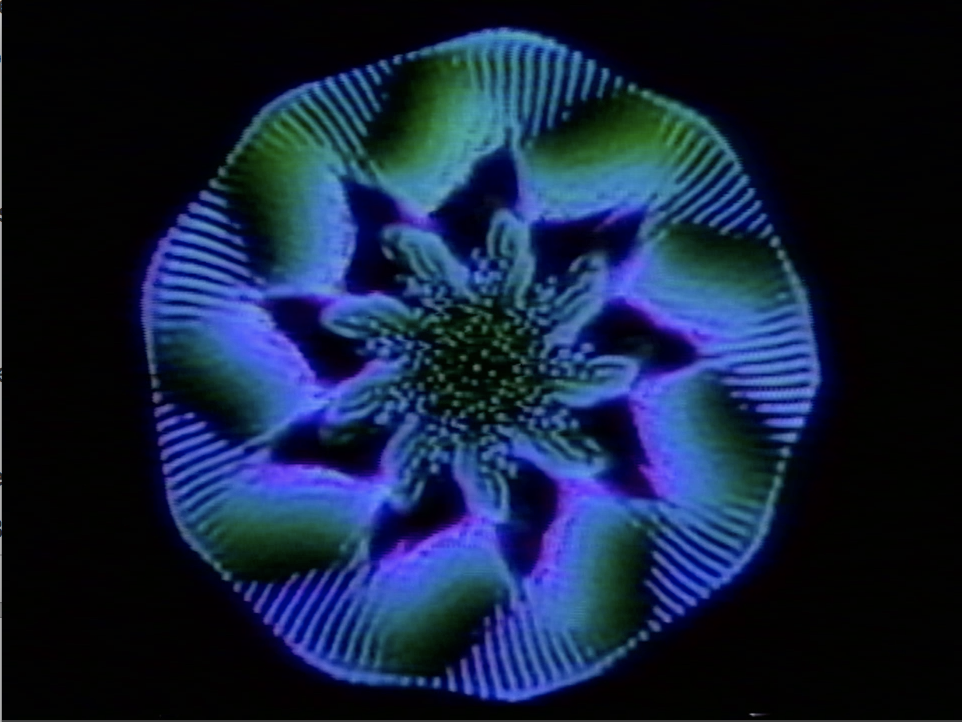
"Synoid" (1983) by Stevo Wolfson, a.k.a. Stevo In Yr Studio, is pure video feedback with no special effects of any kind.

Pure video feedback was perfected by Stevo Wolfson, a.k.a. Stevo In Yr Studio (SIYS), in 1983 with the creation of the video art piece "Synoid" which was created at the School of the Art Institute of Chicago while SIYS was working on his Master of Fine Arts degree. SIYS also created various 1/2-inch reel-to-reel video feedback tape loop art from 1979 to 1983.

During the 1980s and into the 1990s video technology became enhanced and evolved into high quality, high definition video recording. Michael C. Andersen generated the first known mathematical formula of the video feedback process, and he has also generated a Mendeleev's square to show the gradual progressive formulaic change of the video image as certain parameters are adjusted.

In the 1990s the rave scene and a social return to art of a more psychedelic nature brought back displays of video feedback on large disco dance floor video screens around the world. There are filters for non-linear video editors that often have video feedback as the filter description, or as a setting on a filter. These filter types either mimic or directly utilize video feedback for its result effect and can be recognized by its vortex, phantasmagoric manipulation of the original recorded image.

== In entertainment ==
Many artists have used optical feedback. A famous example is Queen's music video for "Bohemian Rhapsody" (1975). The effect (in this simple case) can be compared to looking at oneself between two mirrors.

Other videos that use variations of video feedback include:

- Doctor Who – An Unearthly Child (series, 1963–1973, opening title sequence.)
- Earth, Wind & Fire — "September" (1978)
- The Jacksons – "Blame It On the Boogie" (1978)
- Kate Bush – "Hammer Horror" (1978)
- Amii Stewart – "Knock on Wood" (1979)
- Kool & the Gang – "Get Down On It" (1981)
- Todd Rundgren – "Something to Fall Back On" (1985)
- Smashing Pumpkins – "Ava Adore" (1998)
- Klaxons – "Gravity's Rainbow" (2008)
- Boxcutter – "TV Troubles" (2011)
- Django Django – "Life's A Beach" (2012)

=== "Howlround" and Doctor Who title sequence ===
This technique—under the name "howlround"—was employed for the opening titles sequence for the British science fiction series Doctor Who, which employed this technique from 1963 to 1973.

Initially this was in black and white, and redone in 1967 to showcase the show's new 625-line broadcast resolution and feature the Doctor's face (Patrick Troughton at that time). When the time came for a new Doctor (Jon Pertwee) and the show was to be filmed in colour, an attempt was made to film the 'Howlround' effect in colour too. This proved to be ineffective, so they filmed the entire new title sequence in black and white (Apart from a colour photo of actor Jon Pertwee) and used camera filters to give the illusion of colour. The next title sequence for the show, which debuted in 1973, abandoned this technique in favour of slit-scan photography.

== In science ==
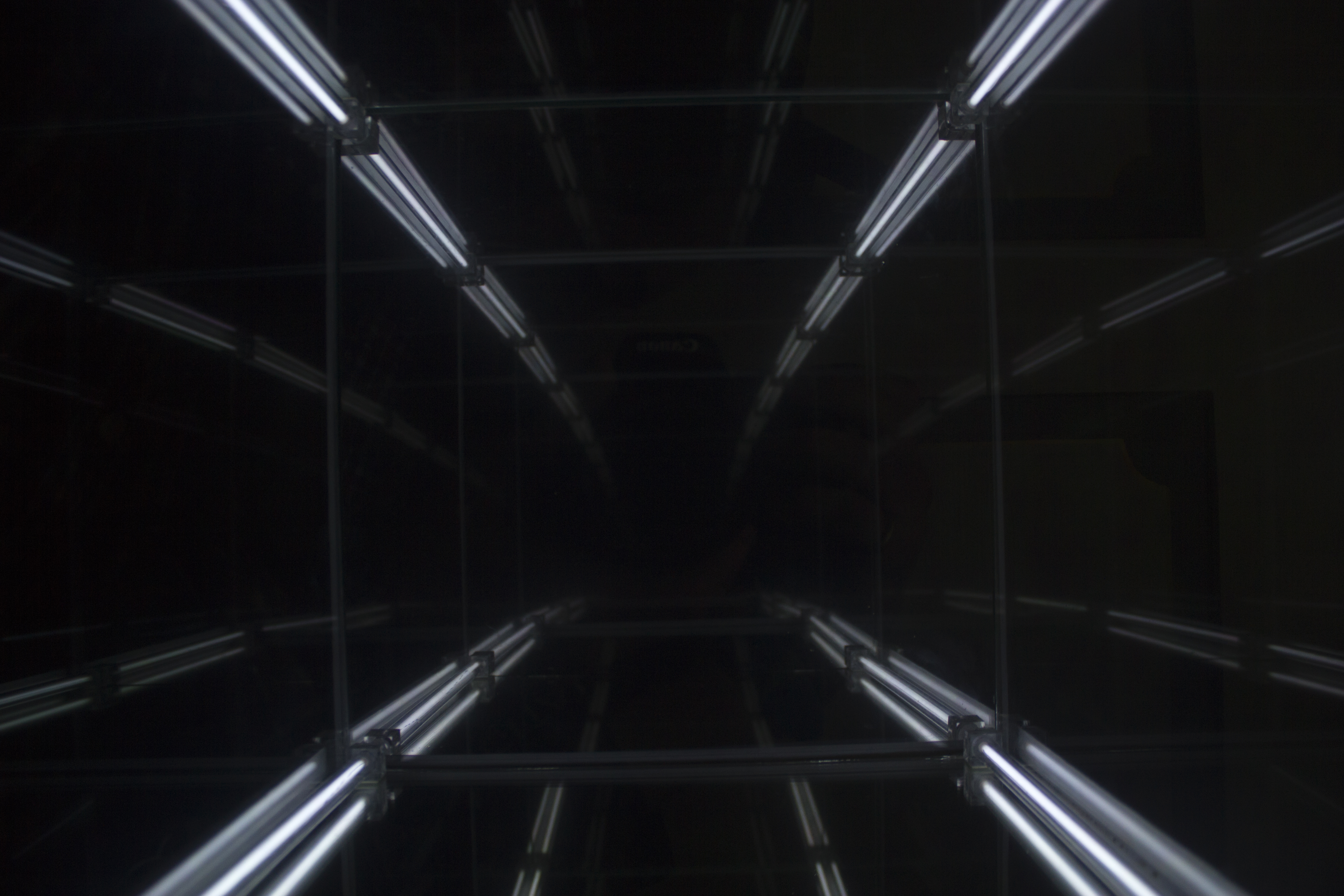
Optical feedback between mirrors

An example of optical feedback in science is the optical cavity found in almost every laser, which typically consists of two mirrors between which light is amplified. In the late 1990s it was found that so-called unstable-cavity lasers produce light beams whose cross-section present a fractal pattern.

Optical feedback in science is often closely related to video feedback, so an understanding of video feedback can be useful for other applications of optical feedback. Video feedback has been used to explain the essence of fractal structure of unstable-cavity laser beams.

Video feedback is also useful as an experimental-mathematics tool. Examples of its use include the making of fractal patterns using multiple monitors, and multiple images produced using mirrors.

Optical feedback is also found in the image intensifier tube and its variants. Here the feedback is usually an undesirable phenomenon, where the light generated by the phosphor screen "feeds back" to the photocathode, causing the tube to oscillate, and ruining the image. This is typically suppressed by an aluminium reflective screen deposited on the back of the phosphor screen, or by incorporating a microchannel plate detector.

Optical feedback has been used experimentally in these tubes to amplify an image, in the manner of the cavity laser, but this technique has had limited use.

Optical feedback has also been experimented with as an electron source, since a photocathode-phosphor cell will 'latch' when triggered, providing a steady stream of electrons.

== In philosophy ==
Video feedback is discussed in Douglas Hofstadter's book I Am a Strange Loop about the human mind and consciousness. Hofstadter devotes a chapter to describing his experiments with video feedback.

At some point during the session, I accidentally stuck my hand momentarily in front of the camera's lens. Of course the screen went all dark, but when I removed my hand, the previous pattern did not just pop right back onto the screen, as expected. Instead I saw a different pattern on the screen, but this pattern, unlike anything I'd seen before, was not stationary.

== See also ==
- Audio/acoustic feedback
- Computer graphics
- Cymatics
- Droste effect
- Feedback
- Real-time computer graphics
- Recursion
- Self-reference
- Strange loop
- Video art
