= Egbert B. Gebstadter =

Fictional author

Copper, Silver, Gold, Gebstadter's first book

Egbert B. Gebstadter is a fictional author who appears in the indices (and sometimes in the text) of books by Douglas R. Hofstadter. For each Hofstadter book, there is a corresponding Gebstadter book. His name is derived from "GEB", the abbreviation for Hofstadter's first book Gödel, Escher, Bach: An Eternal Golden Braid; the letters appear in his last name, permuted in his first name, and permuted again in his initials.

Hofstadter playfully introduces his alter ego, whose name is an anagram of his own, hidden in the Bibliography of his own works, and he appears in the index, though often with page numbers that go nowhere.

== Overview ==
From Gebstadter's brief 1985 biography:

Having spent the last several years in the Psychology Department of Pakistania University in Wiltington, Pakistania, he has recently joined the faculty of the Computer Science Department of the University of Mishuggan in Tom Treeline, Mishuggan, where he occupies the Rexall Chair in the College of Art, Sciences, and Letters. His current research projects in IA (intelligent artifice) are Quest-Essence, Mind-Pattern, Intellect and Studio. His focus is on deterministic sequential models of digital emotion.

The equivalent section of Hofstadter's brief 1985 biography:

Gebstadter's second book, an anthology co-edited with the Australian philosopher Denial E. Dunnitt entitled The Brain's U: Phantoms and Mirror-Images of Selfless Souls, appears in the bibliography of The Mind's I: Fantasies and Reflections on Self and Soul, edited by Hofstadter and Daniel Dennett.

Having spent the last several years in the Computer Science Department of Indiana University in Bloomington, Indiana, he has recently joined the faculty of the Psychology Department of the University of Michigan in Ann Arbor, Michigan, where he occupies the Walgreen Chair in the College of Literature, Science and the Arts. His current research projects in AI (artificial intelligence) are called Seek-Whence, Letter Spirit, Copycat and Jumbo. His focus is on stochastic parallel models of analogical thought.

Most of Gebstadter's books are published by Acidic Books, a fictional publisher in Perth, Australia; which corresponds to Hofstadter's publisher Basic Books of New York.

=== First appearance ===
Gebstadter's first book is first introduced in GEB in one of the dialogs in GEB by the Crab, who recalls its title, and describes it as "filled with strange dialogues about many things...and heaven knows what else".

The bibliography contains more information

Gebstadter, Egbert B. Copper, Silver, Gold: an Indestructible Metallic Alloy. Perth: Acidic Books, 1979. A formidable hodge-podge, turgid and confused -- yet remarkably similar to the present work. Professor Gebstadter's Shandean digressions include some excellent examples of indirect self-reference. Of particular interest is a reference in its well-annotated bibliography to an isomorphic, but imaginary, book.

(According to GEB, the phrase "turgid and confused" was used about the works of Johann Sebastian Bach by his contemporaries.)

CSG is also referred to in the text of GEB itself as Giraffes, Elephants, Baboons: An Equatorial Grasslands Bestiary, which maintains the "GEB: An EGB" acronym. Or perhaps this is a different work by Gebstadter altogether: the evidence is incomplete.

CSG is also referred to in Aria with Diverse Variations, a dialogue in GEB. Achilles and the Tortoise are trying to remember the name of an amateur mathematician, Achilles (incorrectly) suggests "Kupfergödel" and "Silberescher", then Mr Tortoise recalls Goldbach". Half-translated from German, these names are "copper Gödel", "silver Escher" and "gold Bach", respectively.

Gebstadter's second book is an anthology co-edited with the Australian philosopher Denial E. Dunnitt entitled The Brain's U: Phantoms and Mirror-Images of Selfless Souls, and appears in the bibliography of The Mind's I: Fantasies and Reflections on Self and Soul, edited by Hofstadter and Daniel Dennett. The Gebstadter bibliography on the website for Stepford Ninniversity's "Residential Pictures in Mundanities and Artifice" gives the subtitle as Fairy Tales and Rotations on Ego and Anima.

Gebstadter's third book appears in the bibliography to Hofstadter's third book, Metamagical Themas: Questing for the Essence of Mind and Pattern. This is a collection of Hofstadter's monthly columns from Scientific American with postscripts written specially for the book.

Gebstadter, Egbert B. Thetamagical Memas: Seeking the Whence of Letter and Spirit. Perth: Acidic Books, 1985. A curious pot-pourri, bloated and muddled -- yet remarkably similar to the present work. This is a collection of Gebstadter's monthly rows in Literary Australian and a few other articles, all with prescripts. Gebstadter is well known for his love of twisty analogies, such as this one (unfortunately not found in his book): "Egbert B. Gebstadter is the Egbert B. Gebstadter of indirect self-reference."

Gebstadter's fourth book, presumably in Italian, is entitled Ambifoni: un minimondo ottimo per lo studio della scopertività, published by Hopeless Mobster, Tokyo, in 1987. This book is referenced by Hofstadter in his Italian book Ambigrammi: un microcosmo ideale per lo studio della creatività, published by Hopeful Monster, Florence in the same year. Hofstadter's book contains a fictional dialogue between Hofstadter and Gebstadter.

Curiously, there is no mention of Gebstadter's fifth book in Hofstadter's Fluid Concepts and Creative Analogies: Computer Models of the Fundamental Mechanisms of Thought. However, rumor has it that it is entitled Stagnant Notions and Derivative Metaphors: Anthropomorphic Models of the Mechanical Fundaments of Computation, a collection of articles on the research of Gebstadter and his colleagues at the University of Mishuggan's Stagnant Metaphors User Group. Reviewers have supposedly described it as "an eclectic jumble, distended and unfocused," and some have suggested that Hofstadter's Fluid Analogies Research Group was reluctant to give recognition to the work of a rival lab which they sometimes referred to as "those SMUG copycats."

Gebstadter's sixth book is called The Graced Tone of Clément: A la louange de la mélodie des mots, and is referred to in Hofstadter's book Le Ton beau de Marot: In Praise of the Music of Language. He appears in the Bibliography but nowhere in the text or the index. Hofstadter's corresponding book is in English despite its French title, and we may conjecture that Gebstadter's book is in French despite its English title. This is supported by the fact that this book was published not by Acidic Books but by the equally fictional and palindromic Éditions Noitide in Cahors, France.

Gebstadter's seventh book is U Are an Odd Ball (Perth: Acidic Books, 2007), referenced in Hofstadter's I Am A Strange Loop.
