= Epimenides paradox =

Paradox revealing a problem with self-reference in logic

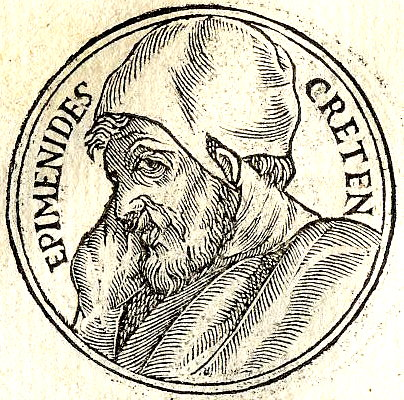
Epimenides from "Promptuarii Iconum Insigniorum"

The Epimenides paradox has to do with self-reference in logic. It is named after the Cretan philosopher Epimenides of Knossos (alive circa 600 BC) who said: "Cretans, liars always, evil beasts, idle bellies". A typical description of the problem (but with an inaccurate quote) is given in the book Gödel, Escher, Bach, by Douglas Hofstadter:

Epimenides was a Cretan who made the immortal statement: "All Cretans are liars." (Note: Greek: Κρῆτες ἀεὶ ψεῦσται)

It is often claimed that a paradox of self-reference arises when one considers whether it is possible for Epimenides to have spoken the truth, but in fact there is no paradox because it may simply be a false statement.

== Mythology of lying Cretans ==
According to Ptolemaeus Chennus, Thetis and Medea had once argued in Thessaly over which was the most beautiful; they appointed the Cretan Idomeneus as the judge, who gave the victory to Thetis. In her anger, Medea called all Cretans liars, and cursed them to never say the truth.

== Logical paradox ==
Thomas Fowler (1869) states the paradox as follows: "Epimenides the Cretan says, 'that all the Cretans are liars,' but Epimenides is himself a Cretan; therefore he is himself a liar. But if he is a liar, what he says is untrue, and consequently, the Cretans are veracious; but Epimenides is a Cretan, and therefore what he says is true; saying the Cretans are liars, Epimenides is himself a liar, and what he says is untrue. Thus we may go on alternately proving that Epimenides and the Cretans are truthful and untruthful." However, this exposition suffers from a logic error – if what Epimenides said is untrue, it does not follow that all Cretans are veracious. Some Cretans, such as Epimenides himself, could be liars.

In more detail, if we assume that the statement is false and that Epimenides is lying about all Cretans being liars, then there must exist at least one Cretan who is honest. This does not lead to a contradiction since it is not required that this Cretan be Epimenides. This means that Epimenides can say the false statement that all Cretans are liars while knowing at least one honest Cretan and lying about this particular Cretan. Hence, from the assumption that the statement is false, it does not follow that the statement is true. So we can avoid a paradox as seeing the statement "all Cretans are liars" as a false statement, which is made by a lying Cretan, Epimenides. The mistake made by Thomas Fowler (and many other people) above is to think that the negation of "all Cretans are liars" is "all Cretans are honest" (a paradox) when in fact the negation is "there exists a Cretan who is honest", or "not all Cretans are liars". The Epimenides paradox can be slightly modified so as not to allow the kind of solution described above, as it was in the first paradox of Eubulides but instead leading to a non-avoidable self-contradiction. Paradoxical versions of the Epimenides problem are closely related to a class of more difficult logical problems, including the liar paradox, Socratic paradox and the Burali-Forti paradox, all of which have self-reference in common with Epimenides. The Epimenides paradox is usually classified as a variation on the liar paradox, and sometimes the two are not distinguished. The study of self-reference led to important developments in logic and mathematics in the twentieth century.

In other words, it is not a paradox once one realizes "All Cretans are liars" being untrue only means "Not all Cretans are liars" instead of the assumption that "All Cretans are honest".

Perhaps better put, for "All Cretans are liars" to be a true statement, it does not mean that all Cretans must lie all the time. In fact, Cretans could tell the truth quite often, but still all be liars in the sense that liars are people prone to deception for dishonest gain. Considering that "All Cretans are liars" has been seen as a paradox only since the 19th century, this seems to resolve the alleged paradox. If 'all Cretans are continuous liars' is actually true, then asking a Cretan if they are honest would always elicit the dishonest answer 'yes'. So arguably the original proposition is not so much paradoxical as invalid.

A contextual reading of the contradiction may also provide an answer to the paradox. The original phrase, "The Cretans, always liars, evil beasts, idle bellies!" asserts not an intrinsic paradox, but rather an opinion of the Cretans from Epimenides. A stereotyping of his people not intended to be an absolute statement about the people as a whole. Rather it is a claim made about their position regarding their religious beliefs and socio-cultural attitudes. Within the context of his poem the phrase is specific to a certain belief, a context that Callimachus repeats in his poem regarding Zeus. Further, a more poignant answer to the paradox is simply that to be a liar is to state falsehoods, nothing in the statement asserts everything said is false, but rather they're "always" lying. This is not an absolute statement of fact and thus we cannot conclude that there is a true contradiction made by Epimenides with this statement.

== Origin of the phrase ==
The phrase is found in the Epistle to Titus:

One of themselves, even a prophet of their own, said, The Cretians are alway liars, evil beasts, slow bellies.

— Titus 1:12, King James Version

Ancient authors such as Clement of Alexandria have informed us that this refers to Epimenides. A commentary on the Bible in Syriac contains a passage on Acts 17:18, apparently translated from Greek and quite possibly originally by Theodore of Mopsuestia, saying:

"In Him we live and move and have our being." The Cretans used to say of Zeus, that he was a prince and was ripped up by a wild boar, and he was buried: and lo! his grave is with us. Accordingly Minos, the son of Zeus, made over him a panegyric and in it he said: "A grave have fashioned for thee, O holy and high One, the lying Kretans, who are all the time liars, evil beasts, idle bellies; but thou diest not, for to eternity thou livest, and standest; for in thee we live and move and have our being."

James Rendel Harris argued that this was in fact based on the poem of Epimenides, and that therefore both the phrase "in Him we live and move and have our being" in Acts and the phrase "Cretans, always liars..." in Titus are based on Epimenides. He offered the following suggestion for the original Greek:

J. Rendel Harris' hypothetical Greek text:

Τύμβον ἐτεκτήναντο σέθεν, κύδιστε μέγιστε,
Κρῆτες, ἀεὶ ψευδεῖς, κακὰ θηρία, γαστέρες ἀργαί.
Ἀλλὰ σύ γ᾽ οὐ θνῄσκεις, ἕστηκας γὰρ ζοὸς αἰεί,
Ἐν γὰρ σοὶ ζῶμεν καὶ κινύμεθ᾽ ἠδὲ καὶ ἐσμέν.

Translation:

They fashioned a tomb for you, holy and high one,
Cretans, always liars, evil beasts, idle bellies.
But you are not dead: you live and abide forever,
For in you we live and move and have our being.

According to Rendel Harris, then, the lie of the Cretans was in denying the immortality of Zeus. Other ancient sources support this.

The phrase "Cretans, always liars" was quoted by the poet Callimachus in his Hymn to Zeus, with the same theological intent as Epimenides:

O Zeus, some say that thou wert born on the hills of Ida;
Others, O Zeus, say in Arcadia;
Did these or those, O Father lie? -- "Cretans are ever liars".
Yea, a tomb, O Lord, for thee the Cretans builded;
But thou didst not die, for thou art for ever.

— Callimachus, Hymn I to Zeus

== Emergence as a logical contradiction ==
The logical inconsistency of a Cretan asserting all Cretans are always liars may not have occurred to Epimenides, nor to Callimachus, who both used the phrase to emphasize their point, without irony, perhaps meaning that all Cretans lie routinely, but not exclusively.

In the 1st century AD, the quote is mentioned in the Epistle to Titus as having been spoken truly by "one of their own prophets."

It was one of them, their very own prophet, who said, "Cretans are always liars, vicious brutes, lazy gluttons." That testimony is true. For this reason rebuke them sharply, so that they may become sound in the faith, not paying attention to Jewish myths or to commandments of those who reject the truth.

— Titus 1:12–14, New Revised Standard Version

Clement of Alexandria, in the late 2nd century AD, fails to indicate that the concept of logical paradox is an issue:

In his epistle to Titus, Apostle Paul wants to warn Titus that Cretans don't believe in the one truth of Christianity, because "Cretans are always liars". To justify his claim, Apostle Paul cites Epimenides.

— Stromata 1.14

During the early 4th century, Saint Augustine restates the closely related liar paradox in Against the Academicians (III.13.29), but without mentioning Epimenides.

In the Middle Ages, many forms of the liar paradox were studied under the heading of insolubilia, but these were not explicitly associated with Epimenides.

Finally, in 1740, the second volume of Pierre Bayle's Dictionnaire Historique et Critique explicitly connects Epimenides with the paradox, though Bayle labels it a "sophisme".

== References by other authors ==
An oblique reference to Epimenides in the context of logic appears in "The Logical Calculus" by W. E. Johnson, Mind (New Series), volume 1, number 2 (April, 1892), pages 235–250. Johnson writes in a footnote,

Compare, for example, such occasions for fallacy as are supplied by "Epimenides is a liar" or "That surface is red," which may be resolved into "All or some statements of Epimenides are false," "All or some of the surface is red."

The Epimenides paradox appears explicitly in "Mathematical Logic as Based on the Theory of Types", by Bertrand Russell, in the American Journal of Mathematics, volume 30, number 3 (July, 1908), pages 222–262, which opens with the following:

The oldest contradiction of the kind in question is the Epimenides. Epimenides the Cretan said that all Cretans were liars, and all other statements made by Cretans were certainly lies. Was this a lie?

In that article, Russell uses the Epimenides paradox as the point of departure for discussions of other problems, including the Burali-Forti paradox and the paradox now called Russell's paradox. Since Russell, the Epimenides paradox has been referenced repeatedly in logic. Typical of these references is Gödel, Escher, Bach by Douglas Hofstadter, which accords the paradox a prominent place in a discussion of self-reference.

It is also believed that the "Cretan tales" told by Odysseus in The Odyssey by Homer are a reference to this paradox.

In The Second Sex (1949) Simone de Beauvoir writes "I think certain women are still best suited to elucidate the situation of women. It is a sophism to claim that Epimenides should be enclosed within the concept of Cretan and all Cretans within the concept of liar: it is not a mysterious essence that dictates good or bad faith to men and women".
