= Strange loop (disambiguation) =

A strange loop is a cyclic structure that goes through several levels in a hierarchical system.

Strange loop may also refer to:

- I Am a Strange Loop, a 2007 book by Douglas Hofstadter which discusses this structure
- A Strange Loop, a musical inspired by the concept of strange loops
