= Drawing Hands =

1948 lithograph by Dutch artist M. C. Escher

- Scanned from The Magic of M. C. Escher
- Artist: M. C. Escher
- Year: 1948
- Medium: Lithograph
- Dimensions: 28.2 cm × 33.2 cm (11.1 in × 13.1 in)
- Preceded by: Up and Down (1947)
- Followed by: Dewdrop (1948)
- Website: Official website

Drawing Hands is a 1948 lithograph by the Dutch artist M. C. Escher in which two lifelike hands appear to emerge from a flat sheet of paper and draw each other. It is among the best-known works by Escher, and an example of an artwork that appears to go from two dimensions to three, then back to two dimensions—a recurring across Escher's work (such as Reptile). Drawing Hands has gained cultural significance as a metaphor, illustrating concepts of interdependence and paradoxical self-creation.

The artwork is discussed in Douglas Hofstadter's book Gödel, Escher, Bach, as an example of a strange loop. It is used in Structure and Interpretation of Computer Programs by Harold Abelson and Gerald Jay Sussman as an allegory for the eval and apply functions of programming language interpreters in computer science, which feed each other.

Variations of the work replace one of the hands with a robotic hand, presenting a scene in which a human hand and robot hand draw each other and bring one another into existence. In April 2023, a New Yorker cover by JooHee Yoon featured a drawing like this, with a robotic hand drawing a human hand which is in turn drawing the robotic hand. The work was meant to address the complex relationship between human creativity and high-tech artificial intelligence, where it's not clear if the real hand is creating the mechanical hand or vice versa.

George Escher, son of M. C. Escher, called Drawing Hands "a true self portrait" of his father.

== Description ==
The New York Times describes the lithograph: "a mechanical pencil held in a right hand draws a mechanical pencil held in a left hand that is, of course, drawing the right hand holding the mechanical pencil that is drawing the left hand."

=== Legacy ===
Drawing Hands has been described as drawing influence from the work of Leonardo da Vinci and Albrecht Dürer, who were active more than 400 years earlier.

M.C. Escher's Drawing Hands is featured in Douglas Hofstadter's 1979 book Gödel, Escher, Bach as a key example of a strange loop, a hierarchical system that folds back on itself through self-reference. Hofstadter compares the self-referencing nature of the lithograph to Gödel's incompleteness theorems in mathematics and the fugues of Johann Sebastian Bach, as well as human cognition and artificial intelligence systems.

== See also ==
- Ouroboros
- Self-licking ice cream cone
