= Bongard problem =

Pattern recognition puzzle

An example Bongard problem, the common factor of the left set being convex shapes (the right set are instead all concave).

A Bongard problem is a visual pattern recognition puzzle that shows two sets of figures and asks what concept sets them apart. The original collection of 100 problems first appeared in an appendix to Soviet computer scientist Mikhail Bongard's 1967 book on pattern recognition. In the preface, Bongard attributes the ideas to joint work with M. N. Vaintsvaig, V. V. Maksimov, and M. S. Smirnov.

== Overview ==
Bongard problems consist of twelve images divided into two sets of six. A solver must formulate a rule or concept that distinguishes the two sets. Because many rules may plausibly distinguish the sets, solving a problem requires inferring what concept the designer likely intended to communicate. Bongard originally presented the problems as a challenge for vision systems, and they have continued to be studied in artificial intelligence and cognitive science research.

Bongard problems were popularized by Douglas Hofstadter's discussion of them in his 1979 book Gödel, Escher, Bach. He wrote that, "the skill of solving Bongard problems lies very close to the core of 'pure' intelligence, if there is such a thing." Hofstadter created 56 new Bongard problems in an unpublished 1977 manuscript.

=== In popular culture ===
Bongard problems influenced the design of the tabletop game Zendo.
