= Le Ton beau de Marot =

1997 book by Douglas Hofstadter about translation

Le Ton beau de Marot: In Praise of the Music of Language
- Author: Douglas Hofstadter
- Language: English
- Published: 1997 (Basic Books)
- Publication place: United States
- ISBN: 0-465-08645-4

Le Ton beau de Marot: In Praise of the Music of Language is a 1997 book by Douglas Hofstadter in which he explores the meaning, strengths, failings and beauty of translation. The book is a long and detailed examination of translations of a minor French poem and, through that, an examination of the mysteries of translation (and indeed more generally, language and consciousness) itself. Hofstadter himself refers to it as "my ruminations on the art of translation".

The title itself is a pun, revealing many of the themes of the work: le ton beau means 'the beautiful tone' or 'the sweet tone', but the word order is unusual for French. It would be more common to write le beau ton. A French speaker hearing the title spoken ([lə tɔ̃ bo də ma.ʁo]) would be more likely to interpret it as le tombeau de Marot; where tombeau may mean 'tomb' (as per the cover picture), but also tombeau, 'a work of art (literature or music) done in memory and homage to a deceased person' (the title is intended to parallel the title of Maurice Ravel's Le Tombeau de Couperin). In a further play on the title, Hofstadter refers to his deceased wife Carol, to whom the book is dedicated, as ma rose ("my rose"), and to himself as ton beau ("your dear").

At the surface level, the book treats the difficulties and rewards of translating works (particularly poetry) from one language to another. Diverse translations (usually to English) of a short poem in Renaissance French, Clément Marot's A une Damoyselle malade (referred to as 'Ma mignonne' by Hofstadter), serve as reference points for his ideas on the subject. Groups of translations alternate with analysis and commentary on the same throughout the book. However, Hofstadter's reading of the idea of 'translation' goes deeper than simply that of translating between languages. Translation between frames of reference—languages, cultures, modes of expression or, indeed, between one person's thoughts and another—becomes an element in many of the same concepts Hofstadter has addressed in prior works, such as reference and self-reference, structure and function, and artificial intelligence.

One theme of this book is the loss of Hofstadter's wife Carol, who died of a brain tumor while the book was being written; she also created one of the numerous translations of Marot's poem presented in the book. In this context the poem, dedicated to 'a sick lady', gained yet another deeply tragic and personal meaning, even though the translations were started long before her illness was even known (Hofstadter went on to follow with an even more personal book titled I Am a Strange Loop after the death of his wife).

== Reception ==
Reviewing the book for The Washington Post, Michael Dirda praised it as "dazzlingly smart, useful, impassioned and extremely enjoyable" and "an exhilarating blend of autobiography, analysis, wordplay, and elegy". Dirda observed that Hofstadter used a narrative voice that is "chatty, energetic and slangy", with "even the most abstruse matters (being) plain and jargon-free," but also faulted the book for its "blithe self-centeredness".

Writing in The New York Times, Robert Alter found it to be "quirky, personal, amusing, sometimes touching and often exasperating", with an "eccentric structure [that] allows [Hofstadter] to talk about pretty much whatever he wants to, some of it only loosely associated with translation." Alter felt that many of Hofstadter's insights about translation "involve a good deal of reinvention of the wheel", and that the book's "ultimate weakness" is that Ma Mignonne is "no more than a charming trifle, with the charm clearly inseparable from its elegant form", concluding that although "Hofstadter has valid things to say about one-half the task of literary translation—the juggling of verbal combinations and permutations", he does not address "the fundamental fact that literature is not merely an articulation of patterns but a deep imagining of the world through words."

Kirkus Reviews described it as "friendly, sometimes brilliant, but generally pedantic", and noted that "despite Hofstadter's multifarious ingenuity, his central insights—e.g., the sublime complexity of language—seem banal", positing that they will be "familiar, not just to philosophers of language and literary critics, but to thoughtful lay readers."

Publishers Weekly stated that the book's "moments of wit, intelligence and uncommon curiosity" are countered by its "diffuse structure and inflated—and sometimes hokey—prose" and its "cheery gee-whizzery [that] often rings false", comparing it negatively to Hofstadter's earlier works.

David Langford, while conceding that the book "isn't science fiction", emphasized that it is "full of SF examples, SF ideas, and that special tingly flavour of intelligent SF."

== See also ==
- Translation studies
- Machine translation
- "On Translating Beowulf"
