= Metamagical Themas =

1985 book by Douglas Hofstadter

Metamagical Themas: Questing for the Essence of Mind and Pattern
- Cover of the first edition
- Author: Douglas Hofstadter
- Language: English
- Subjects: Frederic Chopin, free will, Heisenberg principle, innumeracy, Lisp, memes, prisoner's dilemma, quantum mechanics, Rubik's Cube, William Safire, strange attractors, Alan Turing, etc.
- Published: 1985
- Publisher: Basic Books
- Publication place: United States
- Media type: Print
- Pages: 852
- ISBN: 0-465-04566-9
- OCLC: 11475807

Metamagical Themas is an eclectic collection of articles that Douglas Hofstadter wrote for the popular science magazine Scientific American during the early 1980s. The anthology was published in 1985 by Basic Books.

The volume is substantial in size and contains extensive notes concerning responses to the articles and other information relevant to their content. (One of the notes—page 65—suggested memetics for the study of memes.)

== Contents ==
Major themes of the columns include self-reference in memes, language, art and logic; discussions of philosophical issues important in cognitive science/AI; analogies and what makes something similar to something else (specifically what makes, for example, an uppercase letter 'A' recognizable as such); and lengthy discussions of the work of Robert Axelrod on the prisoner's dilemma, as well as the idea of superrationality.

The concept of superrationality, and its relevance to the Cold War, environmental issues and such, is accompanied by notes on experiments conducted by the author at the time. Another notable feature is the inclusion of two dialogues in the style of those appearing in Gödel, Escher, Bach. Ambigrams are mentioned.

There are three articles centered on the Lisp programming language, in which Hofstadter first details the language itself, and then shows how it relates to Gödel's incompleteness theorem. Two articles are devoted to Rubik's Cube and similar puzzles. Many chapters open with an illustration of an extremely abstract alphabet, yet one which is still gestaltly recognizable as such.

The game of Nomic was first introduced to the public in this column, in June 1982, when excerpts from a book (still unpublished at the time) by the game's creator Peter Suber were printed and discussed.

The index of the book mentions Hofstadter's recurring alter ego, Egbert B. Gebstadter, whose "book" is also referenced in the Bibliography.

== List of Hofstadter's "Metamagical Themas" Chapters ==
From January 1957 through December 1980, Martin Gardner's "Mathematical Games" column was a monthly feature in Scientific American magazine. In 1981, Gardner's column alternated with a new column by Hofstadter called "Metamagical Themas" (an anagram of "Mathematical Games"). Then Hofstadter's column appeared monthly from January 1982 through July 1983.

The Chapters were re-ordered so that they could be grouped more cohesively into seven Sections. A Post Scriptum was added to each chapter often detailing correspondence with readers after the publication of the column.

Date Published	Title of Scientific American Article	Chapter in Metamagical Themas
1981 Jan	An anagrammatic title introduces a new contributor to this column	Chapter 1: On Self-Referential Sentences
1981 Mar	The Magic Cube's cubies are twiddled by cubists and solved by cubemeisters	Chapter 14: Magic Cubology
1981 May	A coffeehouse conversation on the Turing test to determine if a machine can think	Chapter 22: A Coffeehouse Conversation on the Turing Test
1981 Jul	Pitfalls of the uncertainty principle and paradoxes of quantum mechanics	Chapter 20: Heisenberg's Uncertainty Principle and the Many-Worlds Interpretation of Quantum Mechanics
1981 Sep	How might analogy, the core of human thinking, be understood by computers?	Chapter 24: Analogies and Roles in Human and Machine Thinking
1981 Nov	Strange attractors: mathematical patterns delicately poised between order and chaos	Chapter 16: Mathematical Chaos and Strange Attractors
1982 Jan	A self-referential column about last January's column about self-reference	Chapter 2: Self-Referential Sentences: A Follow-Up
1982 Feb	About two kinds of inquiry: "National Enquirer" and "The Skeptical Inquirer"	Chapter 5: World Views in Collision: The Skeptical Inquirer versus the National Enquirer
1982 Mar	Is the genetic code an arbitrary one, or would another code work as well?	Chapter 27: The Genetic Code: Arbitrary?
1982 Apr	The music of Frédéric Chopin: startling aural patterns that also startle the eye	Chapter 9: Pattern, Poetry, and Power in the Music of Frederic Chopin
1982 May	Number numbness, or why innumeracy may be just as dangerous as illiteracy	Chapter 6: On Number Numbness
1982 Jun	About Nomic: a heroic game that explores the reflexivity of the law	Chapter 4: Nomic: A Self-Modifying Game Based on Reflexivity in Law
1982 Jul	Beyond Rubik's Cube: spheres, pyramids, dodecahedrons and God knows what else	Chapter 15: On Crossing the Rubicon
1982 Aug	Undercut, Flaunt, Hruska, behavioral evolution and other games of strategy	Chapter 28: Undercut, Flaunt, Pounce, and Mediocrity: Psychological Games with Numbers
1982 Sep	Can inspiration be mechanized?	Chapter 23: On the Seeming Paradox of Mechanizing Creativity
1982 Oct	Variations on a theme as the essence of imagination	Chapter 12: Variations on a Theme as the Crux of Creativity
1982 Nov	"Default assumptions" and their effects on writing and thinking	Chapter 7: Changes in Default Words and Images, Engendered by Rising Consciousness
1982 Dec	Sense makes more sense than nonsense, but nonsense may still have its purposes	Chapter 11: Stuff and Nonsense
1983 Jan	Virus-like sentences and self-replicating structures	Chapter 3: On Viral Sentences and Self-Replicating Structures
1983 Feb	The pleasures of Lisp: the chosen language of artificial intelligence	Chapter 17: Lisp: Atoms and Lists
1983 Mar	Tripping the light recursive in Lisp, the language of artificial intelligence	Chapter 18: Lisp: Lists and Recursion
1983 Apr	In which a discourse on the language Lisp concludes with a gargantuan Italian feast	Chapter 19: Lisp: Recursion and Generality
1983 May	Computer tournaments of the Prisoner's Dilemma suggest how cooperation evolves	Chapter 29: The Prisoner's Dilemma Computer Tournaments and the Evolution of Cooperation
1983 Jun	The calculus of cooperation is tested through a lottery	Chapter 30: Dilemmas for Superrational Thinkers, Leading Up to a Luring Lottery
1983 Jul	Parquet deformations: patterns of tiles that shift gradually in one dimension	Chapter 10: Parquet Deformations: A Subtle, Intricate Art Form
1983 Sep	Follow on from June 1983 article in which the lottery is actually run.	Chapter 31: Irrationality Is the Square Root of All Evil

The following chapters never appeared as columns:

Chapter Title	Description / Context
Chapter 8: A Person Paper on Purity in Language	Probably his most famous essay. In order to stimulate revulsion at sexism and sexist language DRH uses revulsion at racism and racist language as an analogy. Hofstadter published it under the pseudonym William Satire, an allusion to William Safire.
Chapter 13: Metafont, Metamathematics, and Metaphysics	What makes an "A" an "A"? DRH looks at a very varied set of fonts to try and define "A"-ness. This is then expanded to looking at computer font design and Donald Knuth's Metafont system
Chapter 21: Review of *Alan Turing: The Enigma*	A book review of Andrew Hodges' biography of Turing, which DRH appreciates as being "with great warmth"
Chapter 25: Who Shoves Whom Around Inside the Careenium?	Hofstadter reprises the Achilles-tortoise dialogues from Gödel, Escher, Bach to try to define what we mean when we say "I". Loops back to his earlier book The Mind's I
Chapter 26: Waking Up from the Boolean Dream, or, Subcognition as Computation	An original essay exploring Artificial Intelligence and mental agency, with speculation where the field may go. He presages some of the ideas in his subsequent book on analogies, Fluid Concepts and Creative Analogies
Chapter 32: The Tale of Happiton	An allegorical short story about social traps and arms races, based on Hofstadter's pessimistic view of nuclear deterrence.
Chapter 33: The Tumult of Inner Voices, or, What is the Meaning of the Word 'I'?	A follow on from Chapter 25, on how a soul is made up of many voices.

== French edition ==
Metamagical Themas was also published in French, under the title Ma Thémagie (InterEditions, 1988), the translators being Jean-Baptiste Berthelin, Jean-Luc Bonnetain, and Lise Rosenbaum.

Hofstadter talks of the challenges of translating this book in his subsequent work on translation, Le Ton Beau de Marot.

== Reception ==
Dave Langford reviewed Metamagical Themas for White Dwarf #88, and stated that "a heady mixture of computers, art, mathematics, philosophy, jokes and above all games."

Martin Gardner, the creator of the Mathematical column in Scientific American said “The incredible Dr. Hofstadter is back, in golden-braid form, with a collection of wide-ranging essays that swarm with extraordinary ideas, brilliant fables, deep philosophical questions and Carrollian word play.”

== Sources ==
- Hofstadter, Douglas R. (1986). Metamagical Themas: Questing for the Essence of Mind and Pattern. Bantam Books. ISBN 978-0-553-34279-6.
