= Gödel, Escher, Bach =

1979 book by Douglas Hofstadter

Gödel, Escher, Bach: an Eternal Golden Braid
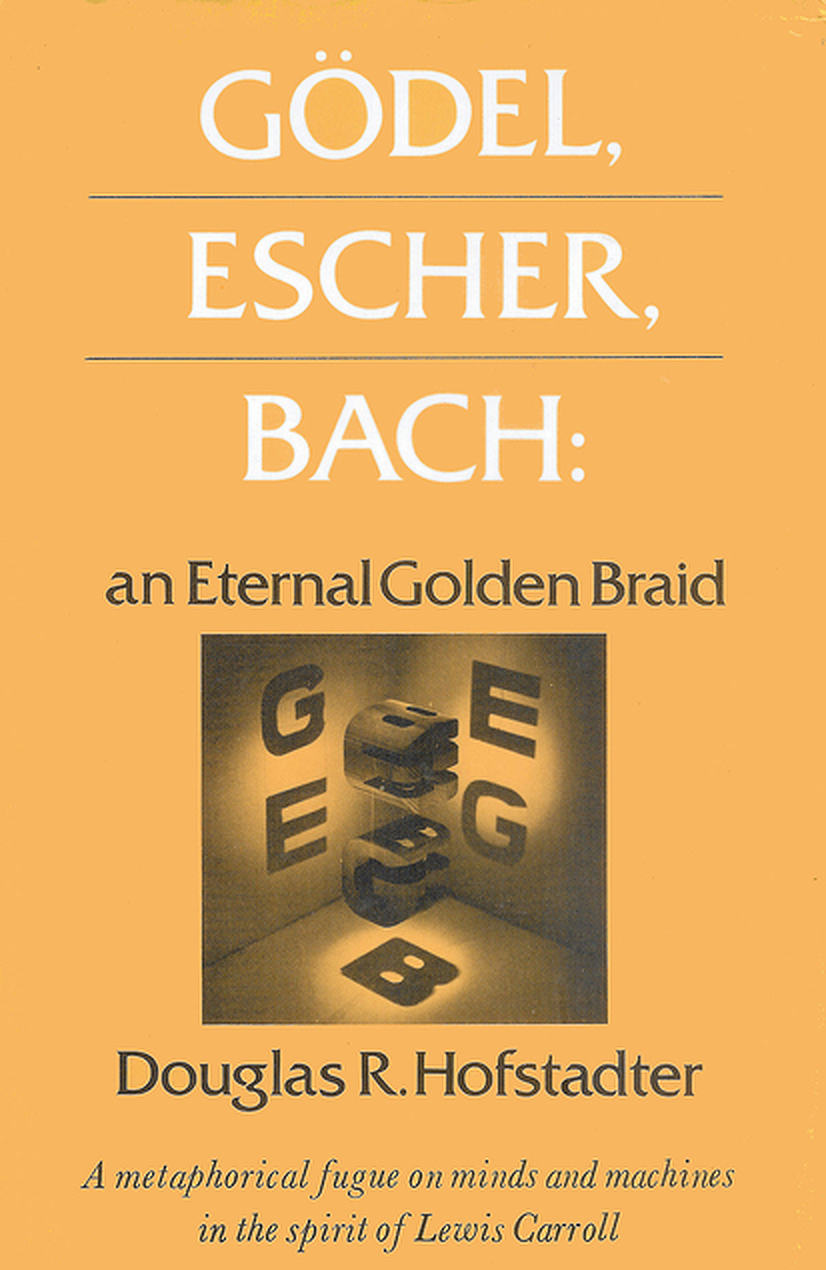
- Cover of the first edition
- Author: Douglas Hofstadter
- Language: English
- Subjects: Consciousness, intelligence, recursivity, mathematics
- Publisher: Basic Books
- Publication date: 1979
- Publication place: United States
- Pages: 777
- ISBN: 978-0-465-02656-2
- OCLC: 40724766
- Dewey Decimal: 510/.1 21
- LC Class: QA9.8 .H63 1999
- Followed by: I Am a Strange Loop

Gödel, Escher, Bach: An Eternal Golden Braid (1979) by Douglas Hofstadter, is a book about the intellectual themes common to the lives and the works of the logician Kurt Gödel, the artist M. C. Escher, and the composer Johann Sebastian Bach, and shows the thematic connections among mathematics, symmetry, and intelligence. Through short stories, illustrations, and analyses, the book explains how systems acquire meaningful context from the "meaningless" elements that compose a system; self-reference and formal rules; isomorphism; the meaning of communication; how knowledge can be represented and stored; the methods and limitations of symbolic representation; and the notion of "meaning".

As a cognitive scientist, Hofstadter said that Gödel, Escher, Bach is not about the relationships of mathematics, art, and music, but about how cognition emerges from hidden neurological mechanisms, e.g. how individual neurons in the brain coordinate to create a coherent mind.

Gödel, Escher, Bach won the Pulitzer Prize for General Nonfiction and the National Book Award for Science Hardcover. (Note: This was the award for hardcover Science. From 1980 to 1983, the National Book Award history gave separate awards to hardcover and paperback books in many categories, including several nonfiction subcategories. Most paperback award-winners were reprints of earlier works; the 1980 Science was eligible for both awards as a new book.)

== Structure ==
Gödel, Escher, Bach is in interweaving narratives and the main chapters alternate dialogues among fictional characters, usually Achilles and the tortoise, first used by Zeno of Elea and later by Lewis Carroll in "What the Tortoise Said to Achilles". These origins are related in the first two dialogues, and later dialogues introduce new characters such as the Crab. These narratives often are self-referential and metafictional.

Word play, such as puns are used to connect ideas, such as the "Magnificrab, Indeed" with Bach's Magnificat in D; "SHRDLU, Toy of Man's Designing" with Bach's "Jesu, Joy of Man's Desiring"; and "Typographical Number Theory", or "TNT", which inevitably reacts explosively when it attempts to make statements about itself. One dialogue contains a story about a genie (from the Arabic "Djinn") and various "tonics" (of both the liquid and musical varieties), which is titled "Djinn and Tonic". Sometimes word play has no significant connection, such as the dialogue "A Mu Offering", which has no close affinity to Bach's The Musical Offering.

One dialogue in the book is written in the form of a crab canon, in which every line before the midpoint corresponds to an identical line past the midpoint. The conversation still makes sense due to uses of common phrases that can be used as either greetings or farewells ("Good day") and the positioning of lines that double as an answer to a question in the next line. Another is a sloth canon, where one character repeats the lines of another, but slower and negated.

== Themes ==
The book contains many instances of recursion and self-reference, where objects and ideas speak about or refer back to themselves. One is Quining, a term Hofstadter invented in homage to Willard Van Orman Quine, referring to programs that produce their own source code. Another is the presence of a fictional author in the index, Egbert B. Gebstadter, a man with initials E, G, and B and a surname that partially matches Hofstadter. A phonograph dubbed "Record Player X" destroys itself by playing a record titled I Cannot Be Played on Record Player X (an analogy to Gödel's incompleteness theorems), an examination of canon form in music, and a discussion of Escher's lithograph of two hands drawing each other.

To describe such self-referencing objects, Hofstadter coins the term "strange loop", a concept he examines in more depth in his follow-up book I Am a Strange Loop. To escape many of the logical contradictions brought about by these self-referencing objects, Hofstadter discusses Zen koans. He attempts to show readers how to perceive reality outside their own experience and embrace such paradoxical questions by rejecting the premise, a strategy also called "unasking".

Elements of computer science such as call stacks are also discussed in Gödel, Escher, Bach, as one dialogue describes the adventures of Achilles and the Tortoise as they make use of "pushing potion" and "popping tonic" involving entering and leaving different layers of reality. The same dialogue has a genie with a lamp containing another genie with another lamp and so on. Subsequent sections discuss the basic tenets of logic, self-referring statements, ("typeless") systems, and even programming. Hofstadter further creates BlooP and FlooP, two simple programming languages, to illustrate his point.

== Puzzles ==
The book is filled with puzzles, including Hofstadter's MU puzzle, which contrasts reasoning within a defined logical system with reasoning about that system. It also discusses Bongard problems, visual pattern-recognition puzzles in which the solver must identify a rule or concept that distinguishes the two sets. Another example can be found in the chapter titled Contracrostipunctus, which combines the words acrostic and contrapunctus (counterpoint). In this dialogue between Achilles and the Tortoise, the author hints that there is a contrapunctal acrostic in the chapter that refers both to the author (Hofstadter) and Bach. This can be spelled out by taking the first word of each paragraph, to reveal "Hofstadter's Contracrostipunctus Acrostically Backwards Spells J. S. Bach". The second acrostic is found by taking the first letters of the words of the first, and reading them backwards to get "J S Bach", as the acrostic sentence self-referentially states.

== Reception and impact ==
Gödel, Escher, Bach won the Pulitzer Prize for General Nonfiction and the National Book Award for Science Hardcover.

Martin Gardner's July 1979 column in Scientific American stated, "Every few decades, an unknown author brings out a book of such depth, clarity, range, wit, beauty and originality that it is recognized at once as a major literary event."

For Summer 2007, the Massachusetts Institute of Technology created an online course for high school students built around the book.

In its February 19, 2010, investigative summary on the 2001 anthrax attacks, the Federal Bureau of Investigation suggested that Bruce Edwards Ivins was inspired by the book to hide secret codes based upon nucleotide sequences in the anthrax-laced letters he allegedly sent in September and October 2001, using bold letters, as suggested on page 404 of the book. It was also suggested that he attempted to hide the book from investigators by throwing it in the trash.

In 2019, British mathematician Marcus du Sautoy curated a series of events at London's Barbican Centre to celebrate the book's fortieth anniversary.

=== I Am a Strange Loop ===
Hofstadter has expressed some frustration with how Gödel, Escher, Bach was received. He felt that readers did not fully grasp that strange loops were supposed to be the central theme of the book, and attributed this confusion to the length of the book and the breadth of the topics covered.

To remedy this issue, Hofstadter published I Am a Strange Loop in 2007, which had a more focused discussion of the idea.

== Translation ==
Hofstadter claims the idea of translating his book "never crossed [his] mind" when he was writing it—but when his publisher brought it up, he was "very excited about seeing [the] book in other languages, especially… French." He knew, however, that "there were a million issues to consider" when translating, since the book relies not only on word-play, but on "structural puns" as well—writing where the form and content of the work mirror each other (such as the "Crab canon" dialogue, which reads almost exactly the same forwards as backwards).

Hofstadter gives an example of translation trouble in the paragraph "Mr. Tortoise, Meet Madame Tortue", saying translators "instantly ran headlong into the conflict between the feminine gender of the French noun tortue and the masculinity of my character, the Tortoise." Hofstadter agreed to the translators' suggestions of naming the French character Madame Tortue, and the Italian version Signorina Tartaruga. Because of other troubles translators might have retaining meaning, Hofstadter "painstakingly went through every sentence of Gödel, Escher, Bach, annotating a copy for translators into any language that might be targeted."

Translation also gave Hofstadter a way to add new meaning and puns. For instance, in Chinese, the subtitle is not a translation of an Eternal Golden Braid, but a seemingly unrelated phrase Jí Yì Bì (集异璧, literally "collection of exotic jades"), which is homophonic to GEB in Chinese. Some material regarding this interplay is in Hofstadter's later book, Le Ton beau de Marot, which is mainly about translation.

== Editions ==
- Hofstadter, Douglas R. (1979), Gödel, Escher, Bach: An Eternal Golden Braid, Basic Books, ISBN 0-465-026850
- Hofstadter, Douglas R. (1999) [1979], Gödel, Escher, Bach: An Eternal Golden Braid (Twentieth Anniversary Edition), Basic Books, ISBN 0-465-02656-7

== See also ==
- Chinese room – Thought experiment on artificial intelligence
- Church–Turing thesis – Thesis on the nature of computability
- Collatz conjecture – Open problem on 3x+1 and x/2 functions
- Fractal – Infinitely detailed mathematical structure
- Heterarchy – System of organization where the elements of the organization are unranked
- Indra's net – Buddhist philosophical metaphor
- Isomorphism – In mathematics, invertible homomorphism
- John Lucas (philosopher) – British philosopher (1929–2020)
- Meta – Prefix in English derived from Greek
- Mind–body problem – Open question in philosophy of how abstract minds interact with physical bodies
- Neural correlates of consciousness – Neuronal events sufficient for a specific conscious percept
- Strange loop – Cycles going through a hierarchy
- Typographical Number Theory – Axiomatic system
