= Strange loop =

Cycles going through a hierarchy

A strange loop is a cyclic structure that goes through several levels in a hierarchical system. It arises when, by moving only upwards or downwards through the system, one finds oneself back where one started. Strange loops may involve self-reference and paradox. The concept of a strange loop was proposed and extensively discussed by Douglas Hofstadter in Gödel, Escher, Bach, and is further elaborated in Hofstadter's book I Am a Strange Loop, published in 2007.

A tangled hierarchy is a hierarchical system in which a strange loop appears.

== Definitions ==
A strange loop is a hierarchy of levels, each of which is linked to at least one other by some type of relationship. A strange loop hierarchy is "tangled" (Hofstadter refers to this as a "heterarchy"), in that there is no well defined highest or lowest level; moving through the levels, one eventually returns to the starting point, i.e., the original level. Examples of strange loops that Hofstadter offers include: many of the works of M. C. Escher, the Canon 5. a 2 from J.S. Bach's Musical Offering, the information flow network between DNA and enzymes through protein synthesis and DNA replication, and self-referential Gödelian statements in formal systems.

In I Am a Strange Loop, Hofstadter defines strange loops as follows:

And yet when I say "strange loop", I have something else in mind — a less concrete, more elusive notion. What I mean by "strange loop" is — here goes a first stab, anyway — not a physical circuit but an abstract loop in which, in the series of stages that constitute the cycling-around, there is a shift from one level of abstraction (or structure) to another, which feels like an upwards movement in an hierarchy, and yet somehow the successive "upward" shifts turn out to give rise to a closed cycle. That is, despite one's sense of departing ever further from one's origin, one winds up, to one's shock, exactly where one had started out. In short, a strange loop is a paradoxical level-crossing feedback loop. (pp. 101–102)

== In cognitive science ==
According to Hofstadter, strange loops take form in human consciousness as the complexity of active symbols in the brain inevitably leads to the same kind of self-reference which Gödel proved was inherent in any sufficiently complex logical or arithmetical system (that allows for arithmetic by means of the Peano axioms) in his incompleteness theorem. Gödel showed that mathematics and logic contain strange loops: propositions that not only refer to mathematical and logical truths, but also to the symbol systems expressing those truths. This leads to the sort of paradoxes seen in statements such as "This statement is false," wherein the sentence's basis of truth is found in referring to itself and its assertion, causing a logical paradox.

Hofstadter argues that the psychological self arises out of a similar kind of paradox. The brain is not born with an "I" – the ego emerges only gradually as experience shapes the brain's dense web of active symbols into a tapestry rich and complex enough to begin twisting back upon itself. According to this view, the psychological "I" is a narrative fiction, something created only from intake of symbolic data and the brain's ability to create stories about itself from that data. The consequence is that a self-perspective is a culmination of a unique pattern of symbolic activity in the brain, which suggests that the pattern of symbolic activity that makes identity, that constitutes subjectivity, can be replicated within the brains of others, and likely even in artificial brains.

== Strangeness ==
The "strangeness" of a strange loop comes from the brain's perception, because the brain categorizes its input in a small number of "symbols" (by which Hofstadter means groups of neurons standing for something in the outside world). So the difference between the video-feedback loop and the brain's strange loops, is that while the former converts light to the same pattern on a screen, the latter categorizes a pattern and outputs its "essence", so that as the brain gets closer and closer to its "essence", it goes further down its strange loop.

== Downward causality ==
Hofstadter thinks that minds appear to determine the world by way of "downward causality", which refers to effects being viewed in terms of their underlying causes. Hofstadter says this happens in the proof of Gödel's incompleteness theorem:

Merely from knowing the formula's meaning, one can infer its truth or falsity without any effort to derive it in the old-fashioned way, which requires one to trudge methodically "upwards" from the axioms. This is not just peculiar; it is astonishing. Normally, one cannot merely look at what a mathematical conjecture says and simply appeal to the content of that statement on its own to deduce whether the statement is true or false. (pp. 169–170)

Hofstadter claims a similar "flipping around of causality" appears to happen in minds possessing self-consciousness; the mind perceives itself as the cause of certain feelings.

The parallels between downward causality in formal systems and downward causality in brains are explored by Theodor Nenu in 2022, together with other aspects of Hofstadter's metaphysics of mind. Nenu also questions the correctness of the above quote by focusing on the sentence which "says about itself" that it is provable (also known as a Henkin-sentence, named after logician Leon Henkin). It turns out that under suitable meta-mathematical choices (where the Hilbert-Bernays provability conditions do not obtain), one can construct formally undecidable (or even formally refutable) Henkin-sentences for the arithmetical system under investigation. This system might very well be Hofstadter's Typographical Number Theory used in Gödel, Escher, Bach or the more familiar Peano Arithmetic or some other sufficiently rich formal arithmetic. Thus, there are examples of sentences "which say about themselves that they are provable", but they don't exhibit the sort of downward causal powers described in the displayed quote.

== Examples ==
Hofstadter points to Bach's Canon per Tonos, M. C. Escher's drawings Waterfall, Drawing Hands, Ascending and Descending, and the liar paradox as examples that illustrate the idea of strange loops, which is expressed fully in the proof of Gödel's incompleteness theorem.

The "chicken or the egg" paradox is perhaps the best-known strange loop problem.

The "ouroboros", which depicts a dragon eating its own tail, is perhaps one of the most ancient and universal symbolic representations of the reflexive loop concept.

A Shepard tone is another illustrative example of a strange loop. Named after Roger Shepard, it is a sound consisting of a superposition of tones separated by octaves. When played with the base pitch of the tone moving upwards or downwards, it is referred to as the Shepard scale. This creates the auditory illusion of a tone that continually ascends or descends in pitch, yet which ultimately seems to get no higher or lower. In a similar way a sound with seemingly ever increasing tempo can be constructed, as was demonstrated by Jean-Claude Risset.

A Shepard–Risset glissando

Visual illusions depicting strange loops include the Penrose stairs and the Barberpole illusion.

A quine in software programming is a program that produces a new version of itself without any input from the outside. A similar concept is metamorphic code.

Efron's dice are four dice that are intransitive under gambler's preference. I.e., the dice are ordered A > B > C > D > A, where x > y means "a gambler prefers x to y".

Individual preferences are always transitive, excluding preferences when given explicit rules such as in Efron's dice or rock-paper-scissors; however, aggregate preferences of a group may be intransitive. This can result in a Condorcet paradox wherein following a path from one candidate across a series of majority preferences may return to the original candidate, leaving no clear preference by the group. In this case, some candidate beats an opponent, who in turn beats another opponent, and so forth, until a candidate is reached who beats the original candidate.

The liar paradox and Russell's paradox also involve strange loops, as does René Magritte's painting The Treachery of Images.

The mathematical phenomenon of polysemy has been observed to be a strange loop. At the denotational level, the term refers to situations where a single entity can be seen to mean more than one mathematical object. See Tanenbaum (1999).

The Stonecutter is an old Japanese fairy tale with a story that explains social and natural hierarchies as a strange loop.

== See also ==
- A Strange Loop – A Broadway musical by Michael R. Jackson that takes its title from and references Hofstadter's strange loop
- Absurdism – Theory that life is meaningless
- Autopoiesis – System capable of producing itself
- Catch-22 – Situation in which one cannot avoid a problem because of contradictory constraints
- Causal loop – Type of temporal paradox
- Dilemma – Problem requiring a choice between equally undesirable alternatives
- Euthyphro dilemma – Ethical problem on the origin of morality posed by Socrates
- Grandfather paradox – Theoretical paradox resulting from time travel – Going back in time to kill one's own grandfather generates a circular contradiction
- Hysteron proteron – Figure of speech reversing a natural or rational order
- Infinite regress – Philosophical problem
- Irony – Literary and rhetorical device or general attitude towards life
- Klein bottle – Non-orientable mathematical surface
- Mise en abyme – Technique of placing a copy of an image within itself, or a story within a story
- Meno – Dialogue by Plato – Paradox: One must already possess any given piece of knowledge, otherwise it could not be recognized when supposedly "discovered"
- Metamorphic code – Type of code used by computer viruses
- Möbius strip – Non-orientable surface with one edge
- Münchhausen trilemma – Thought experiment used to demonstrate the impossibility of proving any truth
- Ontological paradox – Theoretical paradox resulting from time travel
- Optical feedback
- Ouroboros – Symbolic serpent with its tail in its mouth
- Penrose stairs – Impossible object
- Perpetual motion – Work being continuously done without an external input of energy
- Phoenix (mythology) – Immortal bird that is cyclically reborn
- Pitch circularity – Fixed series of tones that appear to ascend or descend endlessly in pitch
- Polytely – Problem-solving technique
- Predestination paradox – Theoretical paradox resulting from time travel
- Reflexivity (social theory) – Circular relationships between cause and effect
- Rock paper scissors – Hand game for two players or more
- Shepard tone – Auditory illusion
- Three hares – Motif of three hares in threefold rotational symmetry
- Tupper's self-referential formula – Formula that visually represents itself when graphed
