= Jason Salavon =

American contemporary artist

Jason Salavon (born 1970) is an American contemporary artist. He is noted for his use of custom computer software to manipulate and reconfigure preexisting media and data to create new visual works of fine art.

== Early life ==
100 Special Moments (Newlyweds), 2004. Digital C-print. 42" x 31.5". Ed. 7 + 2 APs.

The son of an artist, Jason Salavon was born in 1970 in Indianapolis, Indiana and raised in Fort Worth, Texas (Hill 2004). He earned his BA in 1993 from the University of Texas at Austin and his MFA in 1997 from The School of the Art Institute of Chicago. During and after school, Salavon worked as an artist and programmer in the video game industry. After he earned his MFA, he also designed and taught courses as an instructor at The School of the Art Institute of Chicago. Salavon currently lives in Chicago, where he is a studio artist and an associate professor at the University of Chicago.

== Work ==
Salavon is noted for his use of custom computer software to manipulate and reconfigure media and data to create new visual works of art. A significant body of Salavon's work involves two general means of manipulating preexisting media to create works of art: first, by overlaying images (such as multiple photographs) and averaging the result to create visual amalgamations and, second, by distributing processed media (such as individual frames of a movie) side by side or in other configurations. An example of the first means is Salavon's 2004 suite of works, 100 Special Moments, which consists of images based on the average of groups of 100 unique commemorative photographs culled from the Internet.

An example of the second method of production is his 2000 work, The Top Grossing Film of All Time, 1 x 1, which is a static image showing all of the frames of the movie Titanic reduced to the average color most representative of each frame. Salavon employed a similar method in his 2003 series Emblem, reducing films such as Stanley Kubrick's 2001: A Space Odyssey to a set of concentric rings of color representing each frame of the film.

A third part of Salavon's work involves the recomposition of statistical data into visual images. For example, in the 2001 works Shoes, Domestic Production, 1960-1998, Salavon organized and transformed a data set concerning the show industry into "psychedelic constellations" bursting with color. A more recent example is Salavon's 2006 work, American Varietal, a commission to transform census data into site-specific art for the new headquarters of the US Census Bureau in Suitland, Maryland.

Salvon's public installation American Varietal is installed at the US Census Bureau in Suitland, Maryland.

At one point in time, the Google search results for the term "Playboy" placed Salavon's website in a higher position than Playboy's own website. This was likely the result of extensive blogosphere discussion about and linking to Salavon's website for his works Every Playboy Centerfold, The Decades, amalgamations showing the decade-by-decade evolution of the "average" Playboy centerfold from the 1960s to the 1990s.

In 2018 Salavon's work Everything All at Once(Part III) was displayed in the Chicago New Media 1973-1992 exhibition, curated by jonCates.

== Collections ==
- Metropolitan Museum of Art, New York
- National Portrait Gallery, Washington
- the International Center of Photography, New York
