= Christof Teuscher =

American computer scientist

Christof Teuscher is an author and editor who works at the Los Alamos National Laboratory, United States.

Teuscher obtained MSc and PhD degrees from the Swiss Federal Institute of Technology in Lausanne, Switzerland. For his PhD, he explored Alan Turing's ideas on artificial intelligence and neural networks.

He was the initiator and organizer of the Turing Day, an international workshop to commemorate the anniversary of Alan Turing's 90th birthday.

== Bibliography ==
- Alan Turing: Life and Legacy of a Great Thinker (ed.), Springer, (2005), ISBN 3-540-20020-7
- Turing's Connectionism. An Investigation of Neural Network Architectures, Springer, London, (2002), ISBN 1-85233-475-4
- From Utopian to Genuine Unconventional Computers (ed. with Andrew Adamatzky), 2006
- Unconventional Computing 2007 (ed. with Andrew Adamatzky, Lawrence Bull, Ben De Lacy Costello, Susan Stepney), 2007
