= I Am a Strange Loop =

2007 book by Douglas Hofstadter

- Cover of the first edition
- Author: Douglas Hofstadter
- Language: English
- Subject: Consciousness, strange loops, intelligence
- Publisher: Basic Books
- Publication date: March 26, 2007
- Publication place: US
- Media type: Print (hardback)
- Pages: 412 pages
- ISBN: 978-0-465-03078-1
- OCLC: 64554976
- LC Class: BD438.5 .H64 2007
- Preceded by: Gödel, Escher, Bach

I Am a Strange Loop is a 2007 book by Douglas Hofstadter, examining in depth the concept of a strange loop to explain the sense of "I". The concept of a strange loop was originally developed in his 1979 book Gödel, Escher, Bach.

== Synopsis ==
Hofstadter had expressed disappointment with how his book Gödel, Escher, Bach, which won the 1980 Pulitzer Prize for General Nonfiction, was received. In the preface to its 20th-anniversary edition, he laments that the book was perceived as a hodgepodge of neat things with no central theme. He writes: "GEB is a very personal attempt to say how it is that animate beings can come out of inanimate matter. What is a self, and how can a self come out of stuff that is as selfless as a stone or a puddle?"

Hofstadter seeks to remedy this problem in I Am a Strange Loop by focusing on and expounding the central message of Gödel, Escher, Bach. He demonstrates how the properties of self-referential systems, demonstrated most famously in Gödel's incompleteness theorems, can be used to describe the unique properties of minds. As an exploration of the sense of "I", Hofstadter explores his own life and those to whom he has been close.

== Responses ==
The book received favorable reviews. The Wall Street Journal called it "fascinating", "original", and "thought-provoking".

Slovenian philosopher Slavoj Žižek criticizes Hofstadter's approach to selfhood—described as an illusion produced by many self-referencing loops—in his book Less Than Nothing. Drawing on Lacan and Hegel, Žižek writes that Hofstadter's account fails to recognize the necessity of "downward-causality" and that "the unique dignity of a person has nothing to do with the 'greatness' of his or her soul in Hofstadter's sense of integrating elements of numerous other Selves."

== See also ==
- Cogito, ergo sum
- Feedback loop
- Phenomenology (philosophy)
- Russell's paradox
