= Friedman's SSCG function =

Fast-growing function

Friedman's SSCG function is a mathematical function defined by Harvey Friedman. It is defined by $\text{SSCG}(k)$ as the largest integer $n$ satisfying the following:

There is a sequence $G_1,\ldots,G_n$ of simple subcubic graphs such that each $G_i$ has at most $i+k$ vertices and for no $i < j$ is $G_i$ homeomorphically embeddable into $G_j$.

Later, Friedman defined the more general subcubic graphs $\text{SCG}(k)$.

== Background ==
In mathematics, especially graph theory, a simple subcubic graph (SSCG) is a finite simple graph in which each vertex has a degree of at most three. Suppose we have a sequence of simple subcubic graphs $G_1$, $G_2$, ... such that each graph $G_i$ has at most $i+k$ vertices (for some integer $k$) and for no $i<j$ is $G_i$ homeomorphically embeddable into (i.e. is a graph minor of) $G_j$.

The Robertson–Seymour theorem proves that subcubic graphs (simple or not) are well-quasi-ordered by homeomorphic embeddability, implying such a sequence cannot be infinite. Then, by applying Kőnig's lemma on the tree of such sequences under extension, for each value of $k$ there is a sequence with maximal length. The function $\text{SSCG}(k)$ denotes that length for simple subcubic graphs. The function $\text{SCG}(k)$ denotes that length for (general) subcubic graphs.

Harvey Friedman defined two functions: SSCG and SCG.

== SSCG function ==
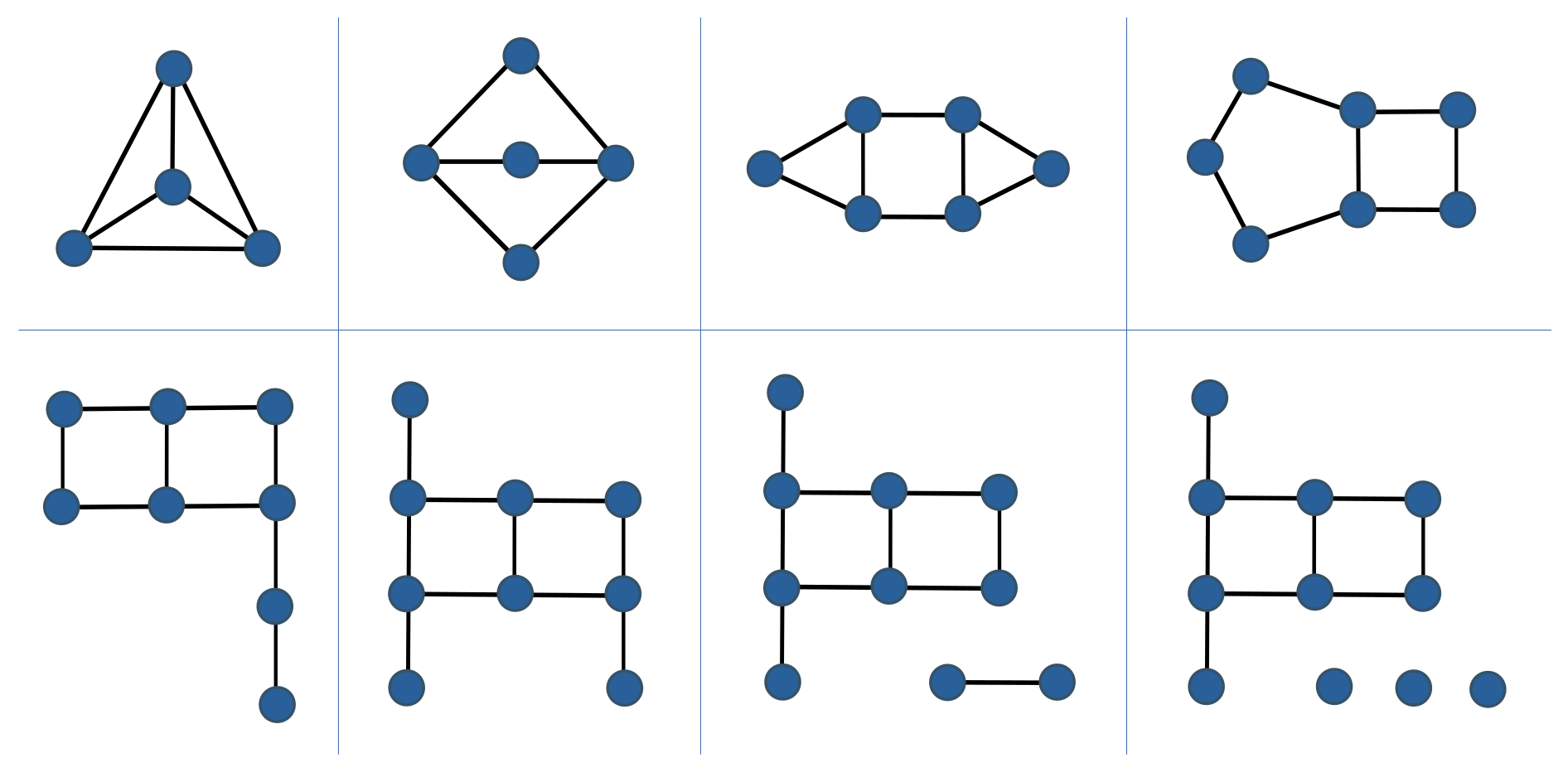
A sequence of subcubic graphs. The $n$-th graph in the sequence contains at most $n+3$ vertices, and no graph is homeomorphically embeddable within any later graph in the sequence. $\operatorname{SSCG}(3)$ is defined to be the longest possible length of such a sequence.

Friedman defined $\text{SSCG}(k)$ as the largest integer $n$ satisfying the following:

There is a sequence $G_1,\ldots,G_n$ of simple subcubic graphs such that each $G_i$ has at most $i+k$ vertices and for no $i < j$ is $G_i$ homeomorphically embeddable into $G_j$.

The first few terms of the sequence are

$$\operatorname{SSCG}(0) = 2,$$
$\operatorname{SSCG}(1) = 5,$ and
$$\operatorname{SSCG}(2) = 3\cdot2^{3\cdot2^{95}}\!\!-8 = 3\cdot2^{118\,842\,243\,771\,396\,506\,390\,315\,925\,504}\! - 8$$
$$\qquad \qquad \; \approx\, 3.241\,704\,229 \cdot 10^{35\,775\,080\,127\,201\,286\,522\,908\,640\,065}$$
$\qquad \qquad \; \approx\, 10^{3.5775 \,\cdot\, 10^{28}} .$

It has been shown that the next term, $\text{SSCG}(3)$, is greater than TREE(3). Friedman showed that $\text{SSCG}(13)$ is greater than the halting time of any Turing machine that can be proved to halt in Π^{1}_{1}-CA_{0} with at most $2\uparrow\uparrow2000$^{[a]} symbols, and that it cannot be proved to exist in that theory with less than $2\uparrow\uparrow1000$ symbols, where $\uparrow\uparrow$ denotes tetration. He does this using a similar idea as with a similar statement he proved about $\text{TREE}(3)$.

== SCG function ==
Later, Friedman realized there was no good reason for imposing "simple" on subcubic graphs. He relaxes the condition and defines $\text{SCG}(k)$ as the largest $n$ satisfying:

There is a sequence $G_1,\ldots,G_n$ of subcubic graphs such that each $G_i$ has at most $i+k$ vertices and for no $i < j$ is $G_i$ homeomorphically embeddable into $G_j$.

The first term of the sequence is $\text{SCG}(0)=6$, while the next term $\text{SCG}(1)$ is bigger than Graham's number. Furthermore, $\text{SCG}(3)$ is bigger than $\text{TREE}^{\text{TREE}(3)}(3)$.

Adam P. Goucher claims there is no qualitative difference between the asymptotic growth rates of SSCG and SCG. He writes "It's clear that $\text{SCG}(n) \ge \text{SSCG}(n)$, but I can also prove $\text{SSCG}(4n+3) \ge \text{SCG}(n)$".

== See also ==
- Goodstein's theorem
- Paris–Harrington theorem
- Kanamori–McAloon theorem
- Kruskal's tree theorem, which leads to the similar TREE function
- Hydra game

== Notes ==
^{^ a} Friedman actually writes this as 2^{[2000]}, which denotes an exponential stack of 2's of height 2000 using his notation.
