= Mechanism (philosophy) =

Belief that natural wholes are similar to machines

Mechanism is the belief that natural wholes (principally living things) are similar to complicated machines or artifacts, composed of parts lacking any intrinsic relationship to each other.

The doctrine of mechanism in philosophy comes in two different varieties. They are both doctrines of metaphysics, but they are different in scope and ambitions: the first is a global doctrine about nature; the second is a local doctrine about humans and their minds, which is hotly contested. For clarity, we might distinguish these two doctrines as universal mechanism and anthropic mechanism.

== Mechanical philosophy ==
Mechanical philosophy is a form of natural philosophy which compares the universe to a large-scale mechanism (i.e. a machine). Mechanical philosophy is associated with the Scientific Revolution of early modern Europe. One of the first expositions of universal mechanism is found in the opening passages of Leviathan by Thomas Hobbes, published in 1651.

Some intellectual historians and critical theorists argue that early mechanical philosophy was tied to disenchantment and the rejection of the idea of nature as living or animated by spirits or angels. Other scholars, however, have noted that early mechanical philosophers nevertheless believed in magic, Christianity and spiritualism.

=== Mechanism and determinism ===
Some ancient philosophies held that the universe is reducible to completely mechanical principles—that is, the motion and collision of matter. This view was closely linked with materialism and reductionism, especially that of the atomists and to a large extent, stoic physics. Later mechanists believed the achievements of the scientific revolution of the 17th century had shown that all phenomena could eventually be explained in terms of "mechanical laws": natural laws governing the motion and collision of matter that imply a determinism. If all phenomena can be explained entirely through the motion of matter under physical laws, as the gears of a clock determine that it must strike 2:00 an hour after striking 1:00, all phenomena must be completely determined, past, present or future.

=== Development ===
The natural philosophers concerned with developing the mechanical philosophy were largely a French group, together with some of their personal connections. They included Pierre Gassendi, Marin Mersenne and René Descartes. Also involved were the English thinkers Sir Kenelm Digby, Thomas Hobbes and Walter Charleton; and the Dutch natural philosopher Isaac Beeckman.

Robert Boyle used "mechanical philosophers" to refer both to those with a theory of "corpuscles" or atoms of matter, such as Gassendi and Descartes, and those who did without such a theory. One common factor was the clockwork universe view. His meaning would be problematic in the cases of Hobbes and Galileo Galilei; it would include Nicolas Lemery and Christiaan Huygens, as well as himself. Newton would be a transitional figure. Contemporary usage of "mechanical philosophy" dates back to 1952 and Marie Boas Hall.

In France the mechanical philosophy spread mostly through private academies and salons; in England in the Royal Society. In England it did not have a large initial impact in universities, which were somewhat more receptive in France, the Netherlands and Germany.

==== Hobbes ====
One of the first expositions of universal mechanism is found in the opening passages of Leviathan (1651) by Hobbes; the book's second chapter invokes the principle of inertia, foundational for the mechanical philosophy. Boyle did not mention him as one of the group; but at the time they were on opposite sides of a controversy. Richard Westfall deems him a mechanical philosopher.

Hobbes's major statement of his natural philosophy is in De Corpore (1655). In part II and III of this work he goes a long way towards identifying fundamental physics with geometry; and he freely mixes concepts from the two areas.

==== Descartes ====
Descartes was also a mechanist. A substance dualist, he argued that reality is composed of two radically different types of substance: extended matter, on the one hand, and immaterial mind, on the other. He identified matter with the spatial extension which is its only clear and distinct idea, and consequently denied the existence of vacuum. Descartes argued that one cannot explain the conscious mind in terms of the spatial dynamics of mechanistic bits of matter cannoning off each other. Nevertheless, his understanding of biology was mechanistic in nature:

"I should like you to consider that these functions (including passion, memory, and imagination) follow from the mere arrangement of the machine’s organs every bit as naturally as the movements of a clock or other automaton follow from the arrangement of its counter-weights and wheels." (Descartes, Treatise on Man, p. 108.)

His scientific work was based on the traditional mechanistic understanding which maintains that animals and humans are completely mechanistic automata. Descartes' dualism was motivated by the seeming impossibility that mechanical dynamics could yield mental experiences.

==== Beeckman ====
Isaac Beeckman's theory of mechanical philosophy described in his books Centuria and Journal is grounded in two components: matter and motion. To explain matter, Beeckman relied on a philosophy of atomism which explains that matter is composed of tiny inseparable particles that interact to create the objects seen in life. To explain motion, he supported the idea of inertia, a theory generated by Isaac Newton.

==== Newton ====
Isaac Newton ushered in a weaker notion of mechanism that tolerated the action at a distance of gravity. Interpretations of Newton's scientific work in light of his occult research have suggested that he did not properly view the universe as mechanistic, but instead populated by mysterious forces and spirits and constantly sustained by God and angels. Later generations of philosophers who were influenced by Newton's example were nonetheless often mechanists. Among them were Julien Offray de La Mettrie and Denis Diderot.

==== Pierre de Laplace ====
The French mechanist and determinist Pierre Simon de Laplace formulated some implications of the mechanist thesis, writing:

We may regard the present state of the universe as the effect of the past and the cause of the future. An intellect which at any given moment knew all of the forces that animate nature and the mutual positions of the beings that compose it, if this intellect were vast enough to submit the data to analysis, could condense into a single formula the movement of the greatest bodies of the universe and that of the lightest atom; for such an intellect nothing could be uncertain and the future just like the past would be present before its eyes.

— Pierre Simon Laplace, A Philosophical Essay on Probabilities

=== Criticism ===
Critics argue that although mechanical philosophy includes a wide range of useful observational and principled data, it has not adequately explained the world and its components, and there are weaknesses in its definitions. Among the criticisms made of this philosophy are:

- Experts in religious studies have criticized the philosophy that God's intervention in the management of the world seems unnecessary.
- Newton's mechanical philosophy, with all its positive effects on human life, ultimately leads to Deism.
- It is a stagnant worldview that cannot explain God's constant presence and favor in the world.
- At the height of this philosophy, God was viewed as a skilled designer, and for him the mental structure and human morality were conceived.
- The assumption that God tuned the world like a clock and left it to its own devices is in clear conflict with the God of the Bible, who is at all times directly and immediately involved in his creation.
- This philosophy abandons concepts such as essence, accident, matter, form, act and potential that are used in ontology, and denies the involvement of transcendental affairs in the management of this world.
- This philosophy is generally incapable of explaining human spiritual experiences and the immaterial realms of the world.
- The mechanistic philosophy arbitrarily bifurcates the natural world into groupings of causes and effects, which follow the dictates of forces and active principles which are ascribed as objective universalities within the natural world anthropomorphically.

== Universal mechanism ==
The older doctrine, here called universal mechanism, is the ancient philosophies closely linked with materialism and reductionism, especially that of the atomists and to a large extent, stoic physics. They held that the universe is reducible to completely mechanical principles—that is, the motion and collision of matter. Later mechanists believed the achievements of the Scientific Revolution had shown that all phenomena could eventually be explained in terms of 'mechanical' laws, natural laws governing the motion and collision of matter that implied a thorough going determinism: if all phenomena could be explained entirely through the motion of matter under the laws of classical physics, then even more surely than the gears of a clock determine that it must strike 2:00 an hour after striking 1:00, all phenomena must be completely determined: whether past, present or future.

The French mechanist and determinist Pierre Simon de Laplace formulated the sweeping implications of this thesis by saying:

We may regard the present state of the universe as the effect of the past and the cause of the future. An intellect which at any given moment knew all of the forces that animate nature and the mutual positions of the beings that compose it, if this intellect were vast enough to submit the data to analysis, could condense into a single formula the movement of the greatest bodies of the universe and that of the lightest atom; for such an intellect nothing could be uncertain and the future just like the past would be present before its eyes.

— Pierre Simon Laplace, A Philosophical Essay on Probabilities

One of the first and most famous expositions of universal mechanism is found in the opening passages of Leviathan by Thomas Hobbes (1651). What is less frequently appreciated is that René Descartes was a staunch mechanist, though today, in the philosophy of mind, he is remembered for introducing the mind–body problem in terms of dualism and physicalism.

Descartes was a substance dualist, and argued that reality was composed of two radically different types of substance: extended matter, on the one hand, and immaterial mind, on the other. Descartes argued that one cannot explain the conscious mind in terms of the spatial dynamics of mechanistic bits of matter cannoning off each other. Nevertheless, his understanding of biology was thoroughly mechanistic in nature:

I should like you to consider that these functions (including passion, memory, and imagination) follow from the mere arrangement of the machine’s organs every bit as naturally as the movements of a clock or other automaton follow from the arrangement of its counter-weights and wheels.

— René Descartes, Treatise on Man, p.108

His scientific work was based on the traditional mechanistic understanding that animals and humans are completely mechanistic automata. Descartes' dualism was motivated by the seeming impossibility that mechanical dynamics could yield mental experiences.

Isaac Newton ushered in a much weaker acceptation of mechanism that tolerated the antithetical, and as yet inexplicable, action at a distance of gravity. However, his work seemed to successfully predict the motion of both celestial and terrestrial bodies according to that principle, and the generation of philosophers who were inspired by Newton's example carried the mechanist banner nonetheless. Chief among them were French philosophers such as Julien Offray de La Mettrie and Denis Diderot (see also: French materialism).

=== Criticism ===
In modern times, philosophers have raised several concerns regarding the manner in which both Descartes and Newton utilized the "scientific methodology" in their formulations of a universal mechanistic metaphysics. Noteworthy is Colin Murray Turbayne, who argued that both Descartes and Newton fell victim to at least three procedural errors while developing a doctrine of universal mechanism.

Their first error emerged with the claim that the certainty which characterizes the use of deductive reasoning in the development of the relationship between theorems and principles is present within the natural world in the form of active principles which serve as catalysts for a causal chain of events. In the process, however, both philosophers exported a characteristic of the process of explaining natural events into the natural world itself and suddenly, "nature... obeys the logic of the deductive method.

In addition, Descartes and Newton artificially bifurcated the natural world into "causes" (such as "gravity", "resistance" or "attraction") and "effects" (such as "bodies at rest" and "bodies in motion") while asserting that any deductive explanation of the natural world must be founded upon causal relationships. By claiming, however, that causal "laws" or "forces" are inherent within the natural world, both Descartes and Newton violated a central tenant of their own scientific method, which calls for direct observational evidence of the presence of such agents.

Their third procedural error, rests with an apriori assumption that all applications of the scientific method must rely upon the use of calculation in order to deduce conclusions. While the use of differential equations is clearly a useful aspect of the scientific method, it is not necessarily the sole definitive characteristic of the development of theorems and conclusions through deductive reasoning. Turbayne notes that to claim otherwise is equivalent to embracing an unnecessarily restrictive definition of the scientific method per se.

== Anthropic mechanism ==
The thesis in anthropic mechanism is not that everything can be completely explained in mechanical terms (although some anthropic mechanists may also believe that), but rather that everything about human beings can be completely explained in mechanical terms, as surely as can everything about clocks or the internal combustion engine.

One of the chief obstacles that all mechanistic theories have faced is providing a mechanistic explanation of the human mind; Descartes, for one, endorsed dualism in spite of endorsing a completely mechanistic conception of the material world because he argued that mechanism and the notion of a mind are logically incompatible. Hobbes, on the other hand, conceived of the mind and the will as purely mechanistic, completely explicable in terms of the effects of perception and the pursuit of desire, which in turn he held to be completely explicable in terms of the materialistic operations of the nervous system. Following Hobbes, other mechanists argued for a thoroughly mechanistic explanation of the mind, with one of the most influential and controversial expositions of the doctrine being offered by Julien Offray de La Mettrie in his Man a Machine (1748).

The main points of debate between anthropic mechanists and anti-mechanists are mainly occupied with two topics: the mind—consciousness, in particular—and free will. Anti-mechanists argue that anthropic mechanism is incompatible with our commonsense intuitions: in philosophy of mind they argue that if matter is devoid of mental properties, then the phenomenon of consciousness cannot be explained by mechanistic principles acting on matter. In metaphysics, anti-mechanists argue that anthropic mechanism implies determinism about human action, which is incompatible with our experience of free will. Contemporary philosophers who have argued for this position include Norman Malcolm and David Chalmers.

Anthropic mechanists typically respond in one of two ways. In the first, they agree with anti-mechanists that mechanism conflicts with some of our commonsense intuitions, but go on to argue that said intuitions are simply mistaken and need to be revised. Down this path lies eliminative materialism in philosophy of mind, and hard determinism on the question of free will. This option is accepted by the eliminative materialist philosopher Paul Churchland. Some have questioned how eliminative materialism is compatible with the freedom of will apparently required for anyone (including its adherents) to make truth claims. The second option, common amongst philosophers who adopt anthropic mechanism, is to argue that the arguments given for incompatibility are specious: whatever it is we mean by "consciousness" and "free will" must be fully compatible with a mechanistic understanding of the human mind and will. As a result, they tend to argue for one or another non-eliminativist physicalist theory of mind, and for compatibilism on the question of free will. Contemporary philosophers who have argued for this sort of account include J. J. C. Smart and Daniel Dennett.

=== Gödelian arguments ===
Some scholars have debated over what, if anything, Gödel's incompleteness theorems imply about anthropic mechanism. Much of the debate centers on whether the human mind is equivalent to a Turing machine, or by the Church-Turing thesis, any finite machine at all. If it is, and if the machine is consistent, then Gödel's incompleteness theorems would apply to it.

Gödelian arguments claim that a system of human mathematicians (or some idealization of human mathematicians) is both consistent and powerful enough to recognize its own consistency. Since this is impossible for a Turing machine, the Gödelian concludes that human reasoning must be non-mechanical.

However, the modern consensus in the scientific and mathematical community is that actual human reasoning is inconsistent: any consistent "idealized version" H of human reasoning would logically be forced to adopt a healthy but counter-intuitive open-minded skepticism about the consistency of H (otherwise H is provably inconsistent); and that Gödel's theorems do not lead to any valid argument against mechanism. This consensus that Gödelian anti-mechanist arguments are doomed to failure is laid out in Artificial Intelligence: "any attempt to utilize [Gödel's incompleteness results] to attack the computationalist thesis is bound to be illegitimate, since these results are quite consistent with the computationalist thesis."

==== History ====
One of the earliest attempts to use incompleteness to reason about human intelligence was by Gödel himself in his 1951 Gibbs Lecture entitled "Some basic theorems on the foundations of mathematics and their philosophical implications". In this lecture, Gödel uses the incompleteness theorem to arrive at the following disjunction: (a) the human mind is not a consistent finite machine, or (b) there exist Diophantine equations for which it cannot decide whether solutions exist. Gödel finds (b) implausible, and thus seems to have believed the human mind was not equivalent to a finite machine, i.e., its power exceeded that of any finite machine. He recognized that this was only a conjecture, since one could never disprove (b). Yet he considered the disjunctive conclusion to be a "certain fact".

In subsequent years, more direct anti-mechanist lines of reasoning were apparently floating around the intellectual atmosphere. In 1960, Hilary Putnam published a paper entitled "Minds and Machines," in which he points out the flaws of a typical anti-mechanist argument. Informally, this is the argument that the (alleged) difference between "what can be mechanically proven" and "what can be seen to be true by humans" shows that human intelligence is not mechanical in nature. Or, as Putnam puts it:

Let T be a Turing machine which "represents" me in the sense that T can prove just the mathematical statements I prove. Then using Gödel's technique I can discover a proposition that T cannot prove, and moreover I can prove this proposition. This refutes the assumption that T "represents" me, hence I am not a Turing machine.

Hilary Putnam objects that this argument ignores the issue of consistency. Gödel's technique can only be applied to consistent systems. It is conceivable, argues Putnam, that the human mind is inconsistent. If one is to use Gödel's technique to prove the proposition that T cannot prove, one must first prove (the mathematical statement representing) the consistency of T, a daunting and perhaps impossible task. Later Putnam suggested that while Gödel's theorems cannot be applied to humans, since they make mistakes and are therefore inconsistent, it may be applied to the human faculty of science or mathematics in general. If we are to believe that it is consistent, then either we cannot prove its consistency, or it cannot be represented by a Turing machine.

J. R. Lucas in "Minds, Machines and Gödel" (1961), and later in his book The Freedom of the Will (1970), lays out an anti-mechanist argument closely following the one described by Putnam, including reasons for why the human mind can be considered consistent. Lucas admits that, by Gödel's second theorem, a human mind cannot formally prove its own consistency, and even says (perhaps facetiously) that women and politicians are inconsistent. Nevertheless, he sets out arguments for why a male non-politician can be considered consistent.

Another work was done by Judson Webb in his 1968 paper "Metamathematics and the Philosophy of Mind". Webb claims that previous attempts have glossed over whether one truly can see that the Gödelian statement p pertaining to oneself, is true. Using a different formulation of Gödel's theorems, namely, that of Raymond Smullyan and Emil Post, Webb shows one can derive convincing arguments for oneself of both the truth and falsity of p. He furthermore argues that all arguments about the philosophical implications of Gödel's theorems are really arguments about whether the Church-Turing thesis is true.

In 1975, Lewis White Beck further argued that all attempts which have been made thus far to prove that mankind is merely "a cog in the machinery of the world" are futile at best and fundamentally irrational in nature by citing a reductio ad absurdum argument. In his book The Actor and the Spectator he avoids the temptation to present an alternative rational argument in support of the mechanistic theory. Instead, he argues that the theory by its very nature is "self-stulifying" and should be accompanied by a "self-exemption clause". This is due to the fact that if mechanistic theories are objectively true, mankind could never acquire knowledge of them or even establish their veracity. This is due to the fact that machines lack the capacity of human imagination by their very nature and are, as a consequence, totally incapable of formulating such a theory in the first place. As Beck patiently reminds his readers, "If you believe that you are not a machine, but that I am (then) I do not know why you are reading this book".

Later, Roger Penrose entered the fray, providing somewhat novel anti-mechanist arguments in his books, The Emperor's New Mind (1989) [ENM] and Shadows of the Mind (1994) [SM]. These books have proved highly controversial. Martin Davis responded to ENM in his paper "Is Mathematical Insight Algorithmic?" (ps), where he argues that Penrose ignores the issue of consistency. Solomon Feferman gives a critical examination of SM in his paper "Penrose's Gödelian argument." The response of the scientific community to Penrose's arguments has been negative, with one group of scholars calling Penrose's repeated attempts to form a persuasive Gödelian argument "a kind of intellectual shell game, in which a precisely defined notion to which a mathematical result applies ... is switched for a vaguer notion".

A Gödel-based anti-mechanism argument can be found in Douglas Hofstadter's book Gödel, Escher, Bach: An Eternal Golden Braid, though Hofstadter is widely viewed as a known skeptic of such arguments:

Looked at this way, Gödel's proof suggests – though by no means does it prove! – that there could be some high-level way of viewing the mind/brain, involving concepts which do not appear on lower levels, and that this level might have explanatory power that does not exist – not even in principle – on lower levels. It would mean that some facts could be explained on the high level quite easily, but not on lower levels at all. No matter how long and cumbersome a low-level statement were made, it would not explain the phenomena in question. It is analogous to the fact that, if you make derivation after derivation in Peano arithmetic, no matter how long and cumbersome you make them, you will never come up with one for G – despite the fact that on a higher level, you can see that the Gödel sentence is true.

What might such high-level concepts be? It has been proposed for eons, by various holistically or "soulistically" inclined scientists and humanists that consciousness is a phenomenon that escapes explanation in terms of brain components; so here is a candidate at least. There is also the ever-puzzling notion of free will. So perhaps these qualities could be "emergent" in the sense of requiring explanations which cannot be furnished by the physiology alone.

== See also ==
- Causality – How one process influences another
- Desiring machine – Concept in philosophy
- Digital physics – Idea that the universe is fundamentally computational or informational
- Necessitarianism – Metaphysical principle
- Philosophy of physics – Truths and principles of the study of matter, space, time and energy
- Teleomechanism – Principle that mechanism is compatible with teleology
