= Peter E. Hodgson =

British physicist (1928–2008)

- Born: 27 November 1928; London, England, UK
- Died: 8 December 2008 (aged 80)
- Education: Imperial College London; University of London
- Occupation: Physicist
- Known for: Work on physics
- Children: 4
- Relatives: 10 grand children

Peter E. Hodgson (27 November 1928, London – 8 December 2008) was a British physicist, who also wrote about the philosophy of physics and social issues, and was an active Roman Catholic.

== Early life ==
Peter E. Hodgson was born on 27 November 1928 in London. He graduated in 1948 with a BSc in physics from Imperial College London. He began experimental research under George Paget Thomson, and was one of the first to identify the K meson and its decay into three pions, giving the most accurate, as of that time, estimate of its mass. In 1951, he was awarded the PhD for this work. In the 1960s, the University of London awarded him the D.Sc.

== Career ==
Hodgson did nuclear physics under Harrie Massey at University College London, studying the scattering of neutrons by alpha particles. This drew the attention of Rudolf Peierls and Denys Wilkinson, who invited him to Oxford on 1958. There he became the head of the Nuclear Physics Theoretical Group, and until his retirement, a lecturer in Nuclear Physics and a Fellow of Corpus Christi College.

Hodgson was actively involved in the study of the impact of science on society, and of the resulting moral obligations of scientists. He was an active member of the Atomic Scientists' Association, serving on its council from 1952 to 1959 and editing its journal from 1953 to 1955.

Hodgson worked closely with the Templeton Foundation, the Newman Society, and other organizations to promote the integration of science and religion. In later years, he became the president of the science secretariat of Pax Romana, whose bulletin he edited and to which he contributed several articles and book reviews. He also became a consultant to the Pontifical Council for Culture (founded 1982). He encouraged Roman Catholic scientists, lay as well as ordained, to integrate their studies and belief, and to publicize their work. He emphasized the need for the Church to be thorough and professional about any scientific advice it took and scientific comment it made.

== Death ==
Hodgson died on 8 December 2008. He had 4 children and 10 Grandchildren.

== Books by Hodgson ==
OUP = Oxford University Press.

=== Technical ===
- 1963, "The Optical Model of Elastic Scattering". OUP. Reprinted in Hodgson (1994).
- 1971. Nuclear Reactions and Nuclear Structure. OUP.
- 1978. Nuclear Heavy-Ion Reactions. OUP.
- 1980–81. Growth Points in Nuclear Physics, Vols. 1-3. Pergamon Press.
- 1988 (with A N Antonov & I Zh. Petkov). Nucleon Momentum and Density Distributions in Nuclei. OUP.
- 1990 (with J. R. Lucas). Spacetime and Electromagnetism. OUP. ISBN 0-19-852038-7.
- 1991 (With E. Gadioli). Pre-Equilibrium Nuclear Reactions. OUP.
- 1993 (with A N Antonov & I Zh. Petkov). Nucleon Corelations in Nuclei. Springer-Verlag
- 1994. The Nucleon Optical Potential. World Scientific. ISBN 981-02-1722-6.
- 1996 (with E. Gadioli & E. Gadioli-Erba). Introductory Nuclear Physics. OUP.
- 1997 (with S A Sofianos). Nuclear Physics. Pretoria: University of South Africa.

=== Other ===
- 1961. Nuclear Physics in Peace and War. London: Burns & Oates.
- 1983. Our Nuclear Future. Belfast: Christian Journals Ltd.
- 1990. Christianity and Science, Studies in Christianity & Science. OUP. ISBN 0-19-832143-0.
- 1994. (with Thomas A. Brody and Luis De La Peña) The Philosophy behind Physics, 2nd ed. Springer. ISBN 0-387-57952-4.
- 1997. Energy and Environment. Bowerdean. ISBN 0-906097-74-6.
- 1999. Nuclear Power, Energy and the Environment. London: Imperial College Press. ISBN 1-86094-088-9.
- 1999. Science, Technology, and Society. Tokyo: Kinseido.
- 2002. Christianity and Science. Johannesburg SA: St. Augustine College.
- 2003. The Roots of Science and Its Fruits. London: The Saint Austin Press.
- 2005. Science and Belief in the Nuclear Age. Sapientia Press of Ave Maria University. ISBN 1-932589-20-1.
- 2006. Theology And Modern Physics, Ashgate Science and Religion Series. London: Ashgate Publishing. ISBN 0-7546-3622-4.
- 2010. Energy, the Environment, and Climate Change. Imperial College Press. ISBN 1-84816-415-7.
