= Minds, Machines and Gödel =

1959 philosophical paper by J. R. Lucas

"Minds, Machines and Gödel" is J. R. Lucas's 1959 philosophical paper in which he argues that a human mathematician cannot be accurately represented by an algorithmic automaton. Appealing to Gödel's incompleteness theorem, he argues that for any such automaton, there would be some mathematical formula which it could not prove, but which the human mathematician could both see, and show, to be true.

The paper is a Gödelian argument against mechanism.

Lucas presented the paper in 1959 to the Oxford Philosophical Society. It was first printed in Philosophy, XXXVI, 1961, then reprinted in The Modeling of Mind, Kenneth M. Sayre and Frederick J. Crosson, eds., Notre Dame Press, 1963, and in Minds and Machines, ed. Alan Ross Anderson, Prentice-Hall, 1964.

== See also ==
- Artificial intelligence
- Philosophy of artificial intelligence
