= Rosser's theorem =

The nth prime number exceeds n log(n).

In number theory, Rosser's theorem states that the $n$th prime number is greater than $n \log n$, where $\log$ is the natural logarithm function. It was published by J. Barkley Rosser in 1939.

Its full statement is:

Let $p_n$ be the $n$th prime number. Then for $n\geq 1$

$$p_n > n \log n.$$

In 1999, Pierre Dusart proved a tighter lower bound for $n\geq 2$:

$$p_n > n (\log n + \log \log n - 1).$$

== See also ==
- Prime number theorem
