= J. Barkley Rosser =

American logician (1907–1989)

John Barkley Rosser
- Born: John Barkley Rosser Sr. December 6, 1907; Jacksonville, Florida, U.S.
- Died: September 5, 1989 (aged 81); Madison, Wisconsin, U.S.
- Education: Princeton University
- Known for: Church–Rosser theorem Kleene–Rosser paradox Rosser's sieve Axiom of counting
- Scientific career
- Fields: Mathematical logic Number theory
- Workplaces: Cornell University; Institute for Defense Analyses; University of Wisconsin–Madison
- Thesis: A Mathematical Logic without Variables (1934)
- Doctoral advisor: Alonzo Church
- Doctoral students: George E. Collins; Elliott Mendelson; Gerald Sacks

John Barkley Rosser Sr. (December 6, 1907 – September 5, 1989) was an American logician, a student of Alonzo Church, and known for his part in the Church–Rosser theorem in lambda calculus. He also developed what is now called the "Rosser's sieve" in number theory. He was part of the mathematics department at Cornell University from 1936 to 1963, chairing it several times. He was later director of the Army Mathematics Research Center at the University of Wisconsin–Madison and the first director of the Communications Research Division of IDA. Rosser also authored mathematical textbooks.

In 1936, he proved Rosser's trick, a stronger version of Gödel's first incompleteness theorem, showing that the requirement for ω-consistency may be weakened to consistency. Rather than using the liar paradox sentence equivalent to "I am not provable," he used a sentence that stated, "For every proof of me, there is a shorter proof of my negation".

In prime number theory, he proved Rosser's theorem.

The Kleene–Rosser paradox showed that the original lambda calculus was inconsistent.

Rosser died of an aneurysm September 5, 1989, at his home in Madison, Wisconsin.

Rosser's son, John Barkley Rosser Jr. (1948–2023), was a mathematical economist and professor at James Madison University in Harrisonburg, Virginia.

== Selected publications ==
- 1934: A mathematical logic without variables, Univ. Diss. Princeton, NJ, p. 127–150, 328–355
- 1953: Logic for mathematicians, McGraw-Hill 2nd edition, Chelsea Publ. Co. 1978, 578 p., ISBN 0-8284-0294-9
- 1969: Simplified Independence Proofs: Boolean Valued Models of Set Theory, Academic Press
- 1984: "Highlights of the History of Lambda calculus", Annals of the History of Computing 6(4): 337–349
- See Barkley Rosser papers at University of Texas
