= Buchholz hydra =

Hydra game in mathematical logic

In mathematics, especially mathematical logic, graph theory and number theory, the Buchholz hydra game is a type of hydra game, which is a single-player game based on the idea of chopping pieces off a mathematical tree. The hydra game can be used to generate a rapidly growing function, $BH(n)$, which eventually dominates all recursive functions that are provably total in "$\textrm{ID}_{\nu}$", and it is not provable that all hydra games terminate in $\textrm{(}\Pi_1^1\textrm{-CA)+BI}$. (Note: For $\Pi_1^1\textrm{-CA}$, see Reverse_mathematics#Π11_comprehension_Π11-CA0)

== Rules ==
The game is played on a hydra, a finite, rooted connected tree $A$, with the following properties:

- The root of $A$ has a special label, usually denoted $+$.
- Any other node of $A$ has a label $\nu \leq \omega$.
- All nodes directly above the root of $A$ have a label $0$.

If the player decides to remove the top node $\sigma$ of $A$, the hydra will then choose an arbitrary $n \in \N$, where $n$ is a current turn number, and then transform itself into a new hydra $A(\sigma, n)$ as follows. Let $\tau$ represent the parent of $\sigma$, and let $A^-$ represent the part of the hydra which remains after $\sigma$ has been removed. The definition of $A(\sigma, n)$ depends on the label of $\sigma$:

- If the label of $\sigma$ is 0 and $\tau$ is the root of $A$, then $A(\sigma, n)$ = $A^-$.
- If the label of $\sigma$ is 0 but $\tau$ is not the root of $A$, $n$ copies of $\tau$ and all its children are made, and edges between them and $\tau$'s parent are added. This new tree is $A(\sigma, n)$.
- If the label of $\sigma$ is $u$ for some $u \in \N$, let $\varepsilon$ be the first node below $\sigma$ that has a label $v < u$. Define $B$ as the subtree obtained by starting with $A_\varepsilon$ and replacing the label of $\varepsilon$ with $u - 1$ and $\sigma$ with 0. $A(\sigma, n)$ is then obtained by taking $A$ and replacing $\sigma$ with $B$. In this case, the value of $n$ does not matter.
- If the label of $\sigma$ is $\omega$, $A(\sigma, n)$ is obtained by replacing the label of $\sigma$ with $n + 1$.

If $\sigma$ is the rightmost head of $A$, $A(n)$ is written. A series of moves is called a strategy. A strategy is called a winning strategy if, after a finite amount of moves, the hydra reduces to its root. This always terminates, even though the hydra can get taller by massive amounts.

== Hydra theorem ==
Buchholz's paper in 1987 showed that the canonical correspondence between a hydra and an infinitary well-founded tree (or the corresponding term in the notation system $T$ associated to Buchholz's function, which does not necessarily belong to the ordinal notation system $OT \subseteq T$), preserves fundamental sequences of choosing the rightmost leaves and the $(n)$ operation on an infinitary well-founded tree or the $[n]$ operation on the corresponding term in $T$.

The hydra theorem for Buchholz hydra, stating that there are no losing strategies for any hydra, is unprovable in $\mathsf{\Pi^1_1 - CA + BI}$.

== BH(n) ==
Suppose a tree consists of just one branch with $x$ nodes, labelled $+, 0, \omega, ..., \omega$. Call such a tree $R^n$. It cannot be proven in $\mathsf{\Pi^1_1 - CA + BI}$ that for all $x$, there exists $k$ such that $R_x(1)(2)(3)...(k)$ is a winning strategy. (The latter expression means taking the tree $R_x$, then transforming it with $n=1$, then $n=2$, then $n=3$, etc. up to $n=k$.)

Define $BH(x)$ as the smallest $k$ such that $R_x(1)(2)(3)...(k)$ as defined above is a winning strategy. By the hydra theorem, this function is well-defined, but its totality cannot be proven in $\mathsf{\Pi^1_1 - CA + BI}$.

== Analysis ==
It is possible to make a one-to-one correspondence between some hydras and ordinals. To convert a tree or subtree to an ordinal:

- Inductively convert all the immediate children of the node to ordinals.
- Add up those child ordinals. If there were no children, this will be 0.
- If the label of the node is not +, apply $\psi_\alpha$, where $\alpha$ is the label of the node, and $\psi$ is Buchholz's function.

The resulting ordinal expression is only useful if it is in normal form. Some examples are:

Conversion
Hydra	Ordinal
$+$	$0$
$+(0)$	$\psi_0(0) = 1$
$+(0)(0)$	$2$
$+(0(0))$	$\psi_0(1) = \omega$
$+(0(0))(0)$	$\omega + 1$
$+(0(0))(0(0))$	$\omega \cdot 2$
$+(0(0)(0))$	$\omega^2$
$+(0(0(0)))$	$\omega^\omega$
$+(0(1))$	$\varepsilon_0$
$+(0(1)(1))$	$\varepsilon_1$
$+(0(1(0)))$	$\varepsilon_\omega$
$+(0(1(1)))$	$\zeta_0$
$+(0(1(1(1))))$	$\Gamma_0$
$+(0(1(1(1(0)))))$	SVO
$+(0(1(1(1(1)))))$	LVO
$+(0(2))$	BHO
$+(0(\omega))$	BO
