= John Lucas (philosopher) =

British philosopher (1929–2020)

John Lucas FBA
- Born: John Randolph Lucas; 18 June 1929; Guildford, England
- Died: 5 April 2020 (aged 90); Somerset, England

Education
- Education: Balliol College, Oxford
- Academic advisor: R. M. Hare

Philosophical work
- Era: Contemporary philosophy
- Region: Western philosophy
- School: Analytic philosophy
- Institutions: Merton College, Oxford
- Main interests: Logic, philosophy of mathematics, philosophy of mind
- Notable works: "Minds, Machines and Gödel" (1959/1961)
- Notable ideas: Gödelian argument Penrose–Lucas argument

John Randolph Lucas (18 June 1929 – 5 April 2020) was a British philosopher.

== Biography ==
Lucas was educated at Winchester College and then, as a pupil of R.M. Hare, among others, at Balliol College, Oxford. He studied first mathematics, then Greats (Greek, Latin, Philosophy and Ancient History), obtaining first class honours in both. He sat for Finals in 1951, and took his MA in 1954. He spent the 1957–58 academic year at Princeton University, studying mathematics and logic. For 36 years, until his 1996 retirement, he was a Fellow and Tutor of Merton College, Oxford, and he remained an emeritus member of the University Faculty of Philosophy. He was a Fellow of the British Academy.

Lucas is perhaps best known for his paper "Minds, Machines and Gödel," arguing that an automaton cannot represent a human mathematician, attempting to refute computationalism.

An author with diverse teaching and research interests, Lucas wrote on the philosophy of mathematics, especially the implications of Gödel's incompleteness theorem, the philosophy of mind, free will and determinism, the philosophy of science including one book on physics co-authored with Peter E. Hodgson, causality, political philosophy, ethics and business ethics, and the philosophy of religion.

The son of a Church of England clergyman, and an Anglican himself, Lucas described himself as "a dyed-in-the-wool traditional Englishman." He had four children (Edward, Helen, Richard and Deborah) with Morar Portal, among them Edward Lucas, a former journalist at The Economist.

In addition to his philosophical career, Lucas had a practical interest in business ethics. He helped found the Oxford Consumers' Group, and was its first chairman in 1961–3, serving again in 1965.

In the early 1980s he, along with Roger Scruton, Kathy Wilkes, and Jürgen Habermas, delivered covert lectures on philosophy in response to a plea from the Czechoslovak intelligentsia. He gave his in a boiler room, handing out copies of the Greek New Testament and Plato’s Republic, both banned.

== Philosophical contributions ==
=== Free will ===
Lucas (1961) began a lengthy and heated debate over the implications of Gödel's incompleteness theorems for the anthropic mechanism thesis, by arguing that:

1. Determinism ↔ For any human h there exists at least one (deterministic) logical system L(h) which reliably predicts h's actions in all circumstances.
2. For any logical system L a sufficiently skilled mathematical logician (equipped with a sufficiently powerful computer if necessary) can construct some statements T(L) which are true but unprovable in L. (This follows from Gödel's first theorem.)
3. If a human m is a sufficiently skillful mathematical logician (equipped with a sufficiently powerful computer if necessary) then if m is given L(m), he or she can construct T(L(m)) and determine that they are true—which L(m) cannot do.
4. Hence L(m) does not reliably predict m's actions in all circumstances.
5. Hence m has free will.
6. It is implausible that the qualitative difference between mathematical logicians and the rest of the population is such that the former have free will and the latter do not.

=== Space, time and causality ===
Lucas wrote several books on the philosophy of science and space-time. In A Treatise on Time and Space, he introduced a transcendental derivation of the Lorentz transformations based on Red and Blue exchanging messages (in Russian and Greek respectively) from their respective frames of reference which demonstrates how these can be derived from a minimal set of philosophical assumptions.

In The Future Lucas gives a detailed analysis of tenses and time, arguing that "the Block universe gives a deeply inadequate view of time. It fails to account for the passage of time, the pre-eminence of the present, the directedness of time and the difference between the future and the past" and in favour of a tree structure in which there is only one past or present (at any given point in spacetime) but a large number of possible futures. "We are by our own decisions in the face of other men's actions and chance circumstances weaving the web of history on the loom of natural necessity".

== Timeline ==
- 1942-7. Scholar of Winchester College
- 1947–51. Attended Balliol College, Oxford on a scholarship.
- 1951. BA with 1st Class Honours, Greats.
- 1951-3. Harmsworth Senior Scholar, Merton College, Oxford.
- 1952. John Locke Scholarship, Oxford University.
- 1953-6. Junior Research Fellow, Merton College, Oxford.
- 1956-9. Fellow and Assistant Tutor, Corpus Christi College, Cambridge.
- 1957-8. Jane Eliza Procter Visiting Fellow, Princeton University.
- 1959–60. Leverhulme Research Fellow, the University of Leeds.
- 1960–96. Fellow and Tutor of Merton College, Oxford.
- 1988. Elected a Fellow of the British Academy.
- 1990-6. Reader in Philosophy, Oxford University.
- 1991-3. President, British Society for the Philosophy of Science.

== Books ==
- 1966. Principles of Politics. ISBN 0-19-824774-5
- 1970. The Concept of Probability. ISBN 0-19-824340-5
- 1970. The Freedom of the Will. ISBN 0-19-824343-X
- 1972. The Nature of Mind. (with A. J. P. Kenny, H. C. Longuet-Higgins, and C. H. Waddington; 1972 Gifford Lectures) ISBN 0-85224-235-2
- 1973. The Development of Mind. (with A. J. P. Kenny, H.C.Longet-Higgins, and C.H.Waddington; 1973 Gifford Lectures) ISBN 0-85224-263-8
- 1973. A Treatise on Time and Space. ISBN 0-416-75070-2
- 1976. Freedom and Grace. ISBN 0-281-02932-6
- 1976. Democracy and Participation. ISBN 0-14-021882-3
- 1978. Butler's Philosophy of Religion Vindicated. ISBN 0-907078-06-0
- 1980. On Justice. ISBN 0-19-824598-X
- 1985. Space, Time and Causality: an essay in natural philosophy. ISBN 0-19-875057-9
- 1989. The Future: an essay on God, temporality, and truth ISBN 0-631-16659-9
- 1990. Spacetime and Electromagnetism (with Peter E. Hodgson) . ISBN 0-19-852038-7
- 1993. Responsibility. ISBN 0-19-823578-X
- 1997. Ethical Economics (with M. R. Griffiths). ISBN 0-312-16398-3
- 2000. Conceptual Roots of Mathematics. ISBN 0-415-20738-X
- 2003. An Engagement with Plato's Republic (with B.G. Mitchell). ISBN 0-7546-3366-7
- 2006. Reason and Reality, freely available as a series of .pdf files on Lucas's website (below). Also available as Reason and Reality: An Essay in Metaphysics by J. R. Lucas (494 pages, December 2009): Hardback is ISBN 978-1-934297-04-9 and Softback is ISBN 978-1-934297-06-3
- 2016. Value Economics: The Ethical Implications of Value for New Economic Thinking (with M.R. Griffiths). ISBN 9781349958986
- 2021. L’economia del valore (Italian translation, also with M.R. Griffiths).ISBN 9788804729099
