= Paris–Harrington theorem =

Theorem in mathematical logic

In mathematical logic, the Paris–Harrington theorem states that a certain claim in Ramsey theory, namely the strengthened finite Ramsey theorem, which is expressible in Peano arithmetic, is not provable in this system. That Ramsey-theoretic claim is, however, provable in slightly stronger systems.

This result has been described by some (such as the editor of the Handbook of Mathematical Logic in the references below) as the first "natural" example of a true statement about the integers that could be stated in the language of arithmetic, but not proved in Peano arithmetic; it was already known that such statements existed by Gödel's first incompleteness theorem. Some authors, such as Rathjen^{p. 4} and Kripke^{p. 5}, consider Gentzen's theorem an earlier example and work of Reuben Goodstein deserving some credit.

== Strengthened finite Ramsey theorem ==
The strengthened finite Ramsey theorem is a statement about colorings and natural numbers and states that:

For any positive integers n, k, m, such that m ≥ n, one can find N with the following property: if we color each of the n-element subsets of S = {1, 2, 3,..., N} with one of k colors, then we can find a subset Y of S with at least m elements, such that all n-element subsets of Y have the same color, and the number of elements of Y is at least the smallest element of Y.

Without the condition that the number of elements of Y is at least the smallest element of Y, this is a corollary of the finite Ramsey theorem in $K_{\mathcal{P}_n(S)}$, with N given by:

$$\binom{N}{n} = |\mathcal{P}_n(S)| \ge R(\,\underbrace{ m, m, \ldots , m }_k\,).$$

Moreover, the strengthened finite Ramsey theorem can be deduced from the infinite Ramsey theorem in almost exactly the same way that the finite Ramsey theorem can be deduced from it, using a compactness argument (see the article on Ramsey's theorem for details). This proof can be carried out in second-order arithmetic.

The Paris–Harrington theorem states that the strengthened finite Ramsey theorem is not provable in Peano arithmetic.

== Paris–Harrington theorem ==
Roughly speaking, Jeff Paris and Leo Harrington (1977) showed that the strengthened finite Ramsey theorem is unprovable in Peano arithmetic by showing in Peano arithmetic that it implies the consistency of Peano arithmetic itself. Assuming Peano arithmetic really is consistent, then by Gödel's second incompleteness theorem, Peano arithmetic cannot prove its own consistency. This shows that Peano arithmetic cannot prove the strengthened finite Ramsey theorem.

The strengthened finite Ramsey theorem can be proven assuming transfinite induction up to $\varepsilon_0$ for a relevant class of formulas. Alternatively, it can be proven assuming the reflection principle, for the arithmetic theory, for $\Sigma_1^0$-sentences. The reflection principle also implies the consistency of Peano arithmetic. It is provable in second-order arithmetic (or the far stronger Zermelo–Fraenkel set theory) and so is true in the standard model of Peano arithmetic, i.e. the natural numbers.

The smallest number N that satisfies the strengthened finite Ramsey theorem is then a computable function of n, m, k, but grows extremely fast. In particular it is not primitive recursive, but it also grows far faster than standard examples of non-primitive recursive functions such as the Ackermann function. It dominates every computable function provably total (see partial function) in Peano arithmetic, which includes functions such as the Ackermann function.

== See also ==
- Goodstein's theorem
- Kanamori–McAloon theorem
- Kruskal's tree theorem
