= Rosser's trick =

Method in mathematical logic

In mathematical logic, Rosser's trick is a method for proving a variant of Gödel's incompleteness theorems not relying on the assumption that the theory being considered is ω-consistent (Smorynski 1977, p. 840; Mendelson 1977, p. 160). This method was introduced by J. Barkley Rosser in 1936, as an improvement of Gödel's original proof of the incompleteness theorems that was published in 1931.

While Gödel's original proof uses a sentence that says (informally) "This sentence is not provable", Rosser's trick uses a formula that says "If this sentence is provable, there is a shorter proof of its negation".

== Background ==
Rosser's trick begins with the assumptions of Gödel's incompleteness theorem. A theory $T$ is selected which is effective, consistent, and includes a sufficient fragment of elementary arithmetic.

Gödel's proof shows that for any such theory there is a formula $\operatorname{Proof}_T(x,y)$ which has the intended meaning that $y$ is a natural number code (a Gödel number) for a formula and $x$ is the Gödel number for a proof, from the axioms of $T$, of the formula encoded by $y$. (In the remainder of this article, no distinction is made between the number $y$ and the formula encoded by $y$, and the number coding a formula $\phi$ is denoted $\#\phi$.) Furthermore, the formula $\operatorname{Pvbl}_T(y)$ is defined as $\exists x\operatorname{Proof}_T(x,y)$. It is intended to define the set of formulas provable from $T$.

The assumptions on $T$ also show that it is able to define a negation function $\text{neg}(y)$, with the property that if $y$ is a code for a formula $\phi$ then $\text{neg}(y)$ is a code for the formula $\neg \phi$. The negation function may take any value whatsoever for inputs that are not codes of formulas.

The Gödel sentence of the theory $T$ is a formula $\phi$, sometimes denoted $G_T$, such that $T$ proves $\phi$ ↔$\neg \operatorname{Pvbl}_T(\#\phi)$. Gödel's proof shows that if $T$ is consistent then it cannot prove its Gödel sentence; but in order to show that the negation of the Gödel sentence is also not provable, it is necessary to add a stronger assumption that the theory is ω-consistent, not merely consistent. For example, the theory $T=\text{PA}+\neg \text{G}_{PA}$, in which PA is Peano axioms, proves $\neg G_T$. Rosser (1936) constructed a different self-referential sentence that can be used to replace the Gödel sentence in Gödel's proof, removing the need to assume ω-consistency.

== The Rosser sentence ==
For a fixed arithmetical theory $T$, let $\operatorname{Proof}_T(x,y)$ and $\text{neg}(x)$ be the associated proof predicate and negation function.

A modified proof predicate $\operatorname{Proof}^R_T(x,y)$ is defined as:

$$\operatorname{Proof}^R_T(x,y) \equiv \operatorname{Proof}_T(x,y) \land \lnot \exists z \leq x [ \operatorname{Proof}_T(z,\operatorname{neg}(y))],$$

which means that

$$\lnot \operatorname{Proof}^R_T(x,y) \equiv \operatorname{Proof}_T(x,y) \to \exists z \leq x [ \operatorname{Proof}_T(z,\operatorname{neg}(y))].$$

This modified proof predicate is used to define a modified provability predicate $\operatorname{Pvbl}^R_T(y)$:

$$\operatorname{Pvbl}^R_T(y) \equiv \exists x \operatorname{Proof}^R_T(x,y).$$

Informally, $\operatorname{Pvbl}^R_T(y)$ is the claim that $y$ is provable via some coded proof $x$ such that there is no smaller coded proof of the negation of $y$. Under the assumption that $T$ is consistent, for each formula $\phi$ the formula $\operatorname{Pvbl}^R_T(\#\phi)$ will hold if and only if $\operatorname{Pvbl}_T(\#\phi)$ holds, because if there is a code for the proof of $\phi$, then (following the consistency of $T$) there is no code for the proof of $\neg \phi$. However, $\operatorname{Pvbl}_T(\#\phi)$ and $\operatorname{Pvbl}^R_T(\#\phi)$ have different properties from the point of view of provability in $T$.

An immediate consequence of the definition is that if $T$ includes enough arithmetic, then it can prove that for every formula $\phi$, $\operatorname{Pvbl}^R_T(\phi)$ implies $\neg \operatorname{Pvbl}^R_T(\text{neg}(\phi))$. This is because otherwise, there are two numbers $n,m$, coding for the proofs of $\phi$ and $\neg \phi$, respectively, satisfying both $n<m$ and $m<n$. (In fact $T$ only needs to prove that such a situation cannot hold for any two numbers, as well as to include some first-order logic.)

Using the diagonal lemma, let $\rho$ be a formula such that $T$ proves $\rho\iff\neg \operatorname{Pvbl}_T^R(\#\rho)$. The formula $\rho$ is the Rosser sentence of the theory $T$.

== Rosser's theorem ==
Let $T$ be an effective, consistent theory including a sufficient amount of arithmetic, with Rosser sentence $\rho$. Then the following hold (Mendelson 1977, p. 160):

1. $T$ does not prove $\rho$
2. $T$ does not prove $\neg \rho$

In order to prove this, one first shows that for a formula $y$ and a number $e$, if $\operatorname{Proof}^R_T(e,y)$ holds, then $T$ proves $\operatorname{Proof}^R_T(e,y)$. This is shown in a similar manner to what is done in Gödel's proof of the first incompleteness theorem: $T$ proves $\operatorname{Proof}_T(e,y)$, a relation between two concrete natural numbers; one then goes over all the natural numbers $z$ smaller than $e$ one by one, and for each $z$, $T$ proves $\neg \operatorname{Proof}_T(z, \text{(neg}(y))$, again, a relation between two concrete numbers.

The assumption that $T$ includes enough arithmetic (in fact, what is required is basic first-order logic) ensures that $T$ also proves $\operatorname{Pvbl}^R_T(y)$ in that case.

Furthermore, if $T$ is consistent and proves $\phi$, then there is a number $e$ coding for its proof in $T$, and there is no number coding for the proof of the negation of $\phi$ in $T$. Therefore $\operatorname{Proof}^R_T(e,y)$ holds, and thus $T$ proves $\operatorname{Pvbl}^R_T(\#\phi)$.

The proof of (1) is similar to that in Gödel's proof of the first incompleteness theorem: Assume $T$ proves $\rho$; then it follows, by the previous elaboration, that $T$ proves $\operatorname{Pvbl}^R_T(\#\rho)$. Thus $T$ also proves $\neg \rho$. But we assumed $T$ proves $\rho$, and this is impossible if $T$ is consistent. We are forced to conclude that $T$ does not prove $\rho$.

The proof of (2) also uses the particular form of $\operatorname{Proof}^R_T$. Assume $T$ proves $\neg \rho$; then it follows, by the previous elaboration, that $T$ proves $\operatorname{Pvbl}^R_T(\text{neg}\#(\rho))$. But by the immediate consequence of the definition of Rosser's provability predicate, mentioned in the previous section, it follows that $T$ proves $\neg \operatorname{Pvbl}^R_T(\#\rho)$. Thus $T$ also proves $\rho$. But we assumed $T$ proves $\neg \rho$, and this is impossible if $T$ is consistent. We are forced to conclude that $T$ does not prove $\neg \rho$.
