= Kanamori–McAloon theorem =

In mathematical logic, the Kanamori–McAloon theorem, due to Kanamori & McAloon (1987), gives an example of an incompleteness in Peano arithmetic, similar to that of the Paris–Harrington theorem. They showed that a certain finitistic theorem in Ramsey theory is not provable in Peano arithmetic (PA).

== Statement ==
Given a set $s\subseteq\mathbb{N}$ of non-negative integers, let $\min(s)$ denote the minimum element of $s$. Let $[X]^n$ denote the set of all n-element subsets of $X$.

A function $f:[X]^n\rightarrow\mathbb{N}$ where $X\subseteq\mathbb{N}$ is said to be regressive if $f(s)<\min(s)$ for all $s$ not containing 0.

The Kanamori–McAloon theorem states that the following proposition, denoted by $(*)$ in the original reference, is not provable in PA:

For every $n,k\in\mathbb{N}$, there exists an $m\in\mathbb{N}$ such that for all regressive $f:[\{0,1,\ldots,m-1\}]^n\rightarrow\mathbb{N}$, there exists a set $H\in[\{0,1,\ldots,m-1\}]^k$ such that for all $s,t\in[H]^n$ with $\min(s)=\min(t)$, we have $f(s)=f(t)$.

== See also ==
- Paris–Harrington theorem
- Goodstein's theorem
- Kruskal's tree theorem
