= Kruskal's tree theorem =

Well-quasi-ordering of finite trees

In mathematics, Kruskal's tree theorem states that the set of finite trees over a well-quasi-ordered set of labels is itself well-quasi-ordered under homeomorphic embedding.

A finitary application of the theorem gives the existence of a fast-growing TREE function. TREE(3) is one of the largest simply defined finite numbers, dwarfing other large numbers such as Graham's number and googolplex.

== History ==
The theorem was conjectured by Andrew Vázsonyi and proved by Joseph Kruskal (1960); a short proof was given by Crispin Nash-Williams (1963). It has since become a prominent example in reverse mathematics as a statement that cannot be proved in ATR_{0} (a second-order arithmetic theory with a form of arithmetical transfinite recursion).

In 2004, the result was generalized from trees to graphs as the Robertson–Seymour theorem, a result that has also proved important in reverse mathematics and leads to the even-faster-growing SSCG function, which dwarfs TREE.

== Statement ==
=== For labeled trees ===
The version given here is that proven by Kruskal (1960). All trees we consider are finite.

Given a tree $T$ with a root, and given vertices $v$, $w$, call $w$ a descendant of $v$ if the unique path from the root to $w$ contains $v$, and call $w$ a child of $v$ if additionally the path from $v$ to $w$ is of length one (contains no other vertex).

Take $(X, \le_X)$ to be a quasi-ordered (preordered) set. If $T_1$, $T_2$ are rooted trees with vertices labeled in $X$, we say that $T_1$ is inf-embeddable in $T_2$ and write $T_1 \leq T_2$ if there is an injective map $F$ from the vertices of $T_1$ to the vertices of $T_2$ such that:

- For all vertices $v$ of $T_1$, the label of $v$ is $\le_X$ the label of $F(v)$;
- If $w$ is any descendant of $v$ in $T_1$, then $F(w)$ is a descendant of $F(v)$; and
- If $w_1$, $w_2$ are any two distinct children of $v$, then $F(w_1)$ and $F(w_2)$ lie in different subtrees of $F(v)$.

Kruskal's tree theorem then states:

If $X$ is well-quasi-ordered, then the set of rooted trees with labels in $X$ is well-quasi-ordered under the inf-embeddable order defined above. That is to say, given any infinite sequence $T_1, T_2, \ldots$ of rooted trees labeled in $X$, there is some $i<j$ so that $T_i \leq T_j$.

=== Statement for plain (unlabeled) trees ===
The following is a corollary of the above; Nash-Williams (1963) provides a direct proof of this statement.

If $T_1$, $T_2$ are unlabeled rooted trees, we say that $T_1$ is embeddable in $T_2$ and write $T_1 \leq T_2$ if there is an injective map $F$ from the vertices of $T_1$ to the vertices of $T_2$ such that only the second and third of the above conditions hold:

- If $w$ is any descendant of $v$ in $T_1$, then $F(w)$ is a descendant of $F(v)$; and
- If $w_1$, $w_2$ are any two distinct children of $v$, then $F(w_1)$ and $F(w_2)$ lie in different subtrees of $F(v)$.

Then:

The set of unlabeled rooted trees is well-quasi-ordered under the embeddable order defined above. That is to say, given any infinite sequence $T_1, T_2, \ldots$ of unlabeled rooted trees, there is some $i<j$ so that $T_i \leq T_j$.

== Friedman's work ==
For a countable label set $X$, Kruskal's tree theorem can be expressed and proven using second-order arithmetic. However, like Goodstein's theorem or the Paris–Harrington theorem, some special cases and variants of the theorem can be expressed in subsystems of second-order arithmetic much weaker than the subsystems where they can be proved. This was first observed by Harvey Friedman in the early 1980s, an early success of the then-nascent field of reverse mathematics. In the case where the trees above are taken to be unlabeled (that is, in the case where $X$ has size one), Friedman found that the result was unprovable in ATR_{0}, thus giving the first example of a predicative result with a provably impredicative proof. This case of the theorem is still provable by Π^{1}_{1}-CA_{0}, but by adding a "gap condition" to the definition of the order on trees above, he found a natural variation of the theorem unprovable in this system. Much later, the Robertson–Seymour theorem would give another theorem unprovable by Π^{1}_{1}-CA_{0}.

Ordinal analysis confirms the strength of Kruskal's theorem, with the proof-theoretic ordinal of the theorem equaling the small Veblen ordinal (sometimes confused with the smaller Ackermann ordinal). Kruskal's tree theorem itself proves that $\Gamma_0$, the Feferman–Schütte ordinal, is well-founded; in particular, the inf-embeddable ordering on a countable label set contains a well-ordered chain of order type $\Gamma_0$.

== Weak tree function ==
Suppose that $P(n)$ is the statement:

There is some $m$ such that if $T_1, \ldots, T_m$ is a finite sequence of unlabeled rooted trees where $T_i$ has $i+n$ vertices, then $T_i \leq T_j$ for some $i<j$.

All the statements $P(n)$ are true as a consequence of Kruskal's theorem and Kőnig's lemma. For each $n$, Peano arithmetic can prove that $P(n)$ is true, but Peano arithmetic cannot prove the statement "$P(n)$ is true for all $n$". Moreover, the length of the shortest proof of $P(n)$ in Peano arithmetic grows phenomenally fast as a function of $n$, far faster than any primitive recursive function or the Ackermann function, for example. The least $m$ for which $P(n)$ holds similarly grows extremely quickly with $n$.

Friedman defined the following function, which is a weaker version of the TREE function below. For a positive integer $n$, take $\text{FFF}(n)$ to be the largest $m$ so that we have the following:

There is a sequence $T_1, \ldots, T_m$ of rooted trees, where each $T_i$ has $i+n-1$ vertices, such that $T_i \leq T_j$ does not hold for any $i<j\leq m$.

Friedman computes the first few terms of this sequence as $\text{FFF}(1)=1$, $\text{FFF}(2)=2$, and $\text{FFF}(3)=5$. He also estimates $\text{FFF}(4)$ to be less than 100, while $\text{FFF}(5)$ suddenly explodes to a very large value. Any proof that $\text{FFF}(5)$ exists in Peano arithmetic requires at least $A(10)$ symbols, where $A(n)$ is the unary version of the Ackermann function, but it can be proved to exist in ACA_{0} with at most 10,000 symbols.

== TREE function ==
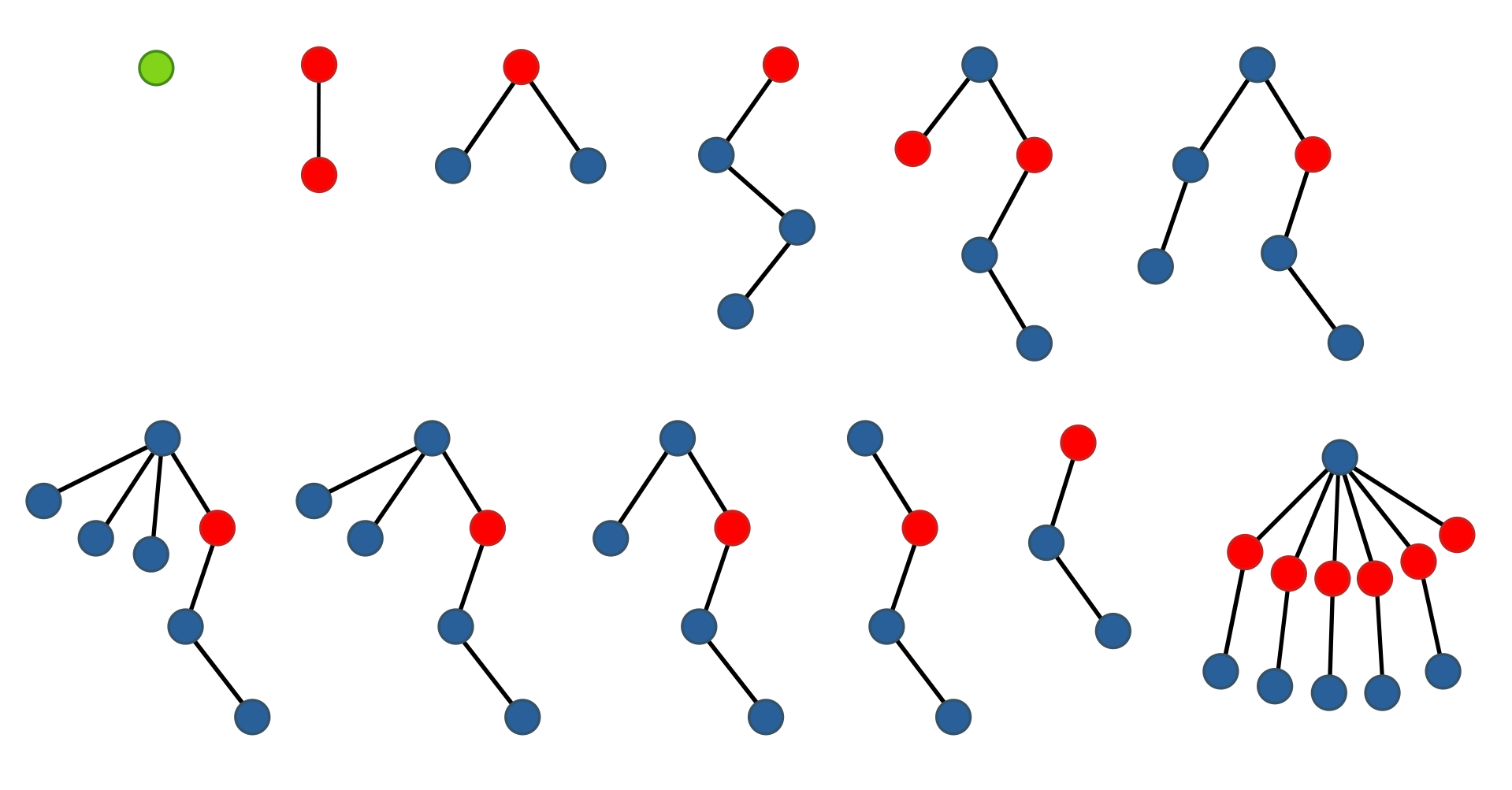
A sequence of rooted trees labelled from a set of 3 labels (blue < red < green). The $n$th tree in the sequence contains at most $n$ vertices, and no tree is inf-embeddable within any later tree in the sequence. $\text{TREE}(3)$ is defined to be the longest possible length of such a sequence.

By incorporating labels, Friedman defined a far faster-growing function. For a positive integer $n$, take $\text{TREE}(n)$^{[a]} to be the largest $m$ so that we have the following:

There is a sequence $T_1, \ldots, T_m$ of rooted trees labelled from a set of $n$ labels, where each $T_i$ has at most $i$ vertices, such that $T_i \leq T_j$ does not hold for any $i<j\leq m$.

A finite version of Kruskal's theorem can be proven, which asserts that $\text{TREE}(n)$ is finite for all $n$. The TREE function eventually dominates every provably recursive function of the system ACA_{0} + Π^{1}_{2}-BI. It grows far faster than $f_{\Gamma_0}(n)$ on the fast-growing hierarchy; Friedman calculated the ordinal $\alpha$ where $\text{TREE}(n)$ and $f_\alpha(n)$ have similar growth rate (under affine transformation of input variables).

The sequence begins $\text{TREE}(1)=1$, $\text{TREE}(2)=3$; before $\text{TREE}(3)$ increases to a value so large that many other "large" combinatorial constants, such as Friedman's $n(4)$ and Graham's number,^{[b]} are surpassed by comparison. A lower bound for $n(4)$, and, hence, an extremely weak lower bound for $\text{TREE}(3)$, is $A^{A(187196)}(1)$,^{[c]} where $A(x)$ is the single-argument version of Ackermann's function, defined as $A(x)=A(x,x)$.

Friedman showed that $\text{TREE}(3)$ is greater than the halting time of any Turing machine that can be proved to halt in ACA_{0} + Π^{1}_{2}-BI with at most $2\uparrow\uparrow1000$ symbols,^{[d]} where $\uparrow\uparrow$ denotes tetration.

== See also ==
- Paris–Harrington theorem
- Kanamori–McAloon theorem
- Robertson–Seymour theorem

== Notes ==
^{^ a} Friedman originally denoted this function by $\text{TR}[n]$.
^{^ b} $n(k)$ is defined as the length of the longest possible sequence that can be constructed with a $k$-letter alphabet such that no block of letters $x_i,\ldots,x_{2i}$ is a subsequence of any later block $x_j,\ldots,x_{2j}$. For example $n(1) = 3$, $n(2) = 11$, and $n(3) > 2 \uparrow^{7197} 158386$.
^{^ c} The superscript indicates iteration. For example, $A^{3}(1)$ would mean computing $A(A(A(1)))$.
^{^ d} Friedman actually writes this as 2^{[1000]}, which denotes an exponential stack of 2's of height 1000 using his notation.
