= Haar's Tauberian theorem =

In mathematical analysis, Haar's Tauberian theorem named after Alfréd Haar, relates the asymptotic behaviour of a continuous function to properties of its Laplace transform. It is related to the integral formulation of the Hardy–Littlewood Tauberian theorem.

== Simplified version by Feller ==
William Feller gives the following simplified form for this theorem:

Suppose that $f(t)$ is a non-negative and continuous function for $t \geq 0$, having finite Laplace transform

$$F(s) = \int_0^\infty e^{-st} f(t)\,dt$$

for $s>0$. Then $F(s)$ is well defined for any complex value of $s=x+iy$ with $x>0$. Suppose that $F$ verifies the following conditions:

1. For $y \neq 0$ the function $F(x+iy)$ (which is regular on the right half-plane $x>0$) has continuous boundary values $F(iy)$ as $x \to +0$, for $x \geq 0$ and $y \neq 0$, furthermore for $s=iy$ it may be written as

$$F(s) = \frac{C}{s} + \psi(s),$$

where $\psi(iy)$ has finite derivatives $\psi'(iy),\ldots,\psi^{(r)}(iy)$ and $\psi^{(r)}(iy)$ is bounded in every finite interval;

2. The integral

$$\int_0^\infty e^{ity} F(x+iy) \, dy$$

converges uniformly with respect to $t \geq T$ for fixed $x>0$ and $T>0$;

3. $F(x+iy) \to 0$ as $y \to \pm\infty$, uniformly with respect to $x \geq 0$;

4. $F'(iy),\ldots,F^{(r)}(iy)$ tend to zero as $y \to \pm\infty$;

5. The integrals

$\int_{-\infty}^{y_1} e^{ity} F^{(r)}(iy) \, dy$ and $\int_{y_2}^\infty e^{ity} F^{(r)}(iy) \, dy$

converge uniformly with respect to $t \geq T$ for fixed $y_1 < 0$, $y_2 > 0$ and $T>0$.

Under these conditions

$$\lim_{t \to \infty} t^r[f(t)-C] = 0.$$

== Complete version ==
A more detailed version is given in.

Suppose that $f(t)$ is a continuous function for $t \geq 0$, having Laplace transform

$$F(s) = \int_0^\infty e^{-st} f(t)\,dt$$

with the following properties

1. For all values $s=x+iy$ with $x>a$ the function $F(s)=F(x+iy)$ is regular;

2. For all $x>a$, the function $F(x+iy)$, considered as a function of the variable $y$, has the Fourier property ("Fourierschen Charakter besitzt") defined by Haar as for any $\delta>0$ there is a value $\omega$ such that for all $t \geq T$

$$\Big| \, \int_\alpha^\beta e^{iyt} F(x+iy) \, dy \; \Big| < \delta$$

whenever $\alpha,\beta \geq \omega$ or $\alpha,\beta \leq -\omega$.

3. The function $F(s)$ has a boundary value for $\Re s = a$ of the form

$$F(s) = \sum_{j=1}^N \frac{c_j}{(s-s_j)^{\rho_j}} + \psi(s)$$

where $s_j = a + i y_j$ and $\psi(a+iy)$ is an $n$ times differentiable function of $y$ and such that the derivative

$$\left| \frac{d^n \psi(a+iy)}{dy^n} \right|$$

is bounded on any finite interval (for the variable $y$)

4. The derivatives

$$\frac{d^k F(a+iy)}{dy^k}$$

for $k=0,\ldots,n-1$ have zero limit for $y \to \pm\infty$ and for $k=n$ has the Fourier property as defined above.

5. For sufficiently large $t$ the following hold

$$\lim_{y \to \pm\infty} \int_{a+iy}^{x+iy} e^{st} F(s) \, ds = 0$$

Under the above hypotheses we have the asymptotic formula

$$\lim_{t \to \infty} t^n e^{-at} \Big[ f(t) - \sum_{j=1}^{N} \frac{c_j}{\Gamma(\rho_j)} e^{s_j t} t^{\rho_j - 1} \Big] = 0.$$
