= Alfred Tauber =

Hungarian mathematician (1866–1942)

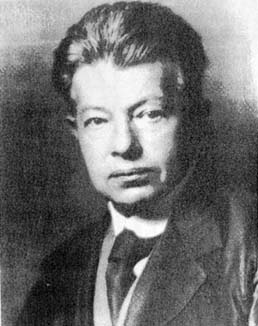
- Born: 5 November 1866; Pressburg, Kingdom of Hungary, Austrian Empire (today Bratislava, Slovakia)
- Died: 26 July 1942 (aged 75); Theresienstadt concentration camp, Czechoslovakia
- Education: University of Vienna
- Known for: Abelian and tauberian theorems
- Scientific career
- Fields: Mathematics
- Workplaces: TU Wien; University of Vienna
- Theses: Über einige Sätze der Gruppentheorie (1889); Über den Zusammenhang des reellen und imaginären Teiles einer Potenzreihe (1891)
- Doctoral advisor: Gustav von Escherich; Emil Weyr

Alfred Tauber (5 November 1866 – 26 July 1942) was a mathematician, known for his contribution to mathematical analysis and to the theory of functions of a complex variable: he is the eponym of an important class of theorems with applications ranging from mathematical and harmonic analysis to number theory. He was born in Austria-Hungary, lived in Vienna, Austria after the dissolution of the empire, and was deported and murdered for being Jewish when the Theresienstadt concentration camp was emptied of Jews in 1942.

== Life and academic career ==
Born in Pressburg, Kingdom of Hungary, Austrian Empire (now Bratislava, Slovakia), he began studying mathematics at Vienna University in 1884, obtained his Ph.D. in 1889, and his habilitation in 1891. Starting from 1892, he worked as chief mathematician at the Phönix insurance company until 1908, when he became an a.o. professor at the University of Vienna, though, already from 1901, he had been honorary professor at TU Vienna and director of its insurance mathematics chair. In 1933, he was awarded the Grand Decoration of Honour in Silver for Services to the Republic of Austria, and retired as emeritus extraordinary professor. However, he continued lecturing as a privatdozent until 1938, when he was forced to resign as a consequence of the "Anschluss". On 28–29 June 1942, he was deported with transport IV/2, č. 621 to Theresienstadt, where he was murdered on 26 July 1942.

== Work ==
Pinl & Dick (1974, p. 202) list 35 publications in the bibliography appended to his obituary, and also a search performed on the "Jahrbuch über die Fortschritte der Mathematik" database results in a list 35 mathematical works authored by him, spanning a period of time from 1891 to 1940. However, Hlawka (2007) cites two papers on actuarial mathematics which do not appear in these two bibliographical lists and Binder's bibliography of Tauber's works (1984, pp. 163–166), while listing 71 entries including the ones in the bibliography of Pinl & Dick (1974, p. 202) and the two cited by Hlawka, does not includes the short note (Tauber 1895) so the exact number of his works is not known. According to Hlawka (2007), his scientific research can be divided into three areas: the first one comprises his work on the theory of functions of a complex variable and on potential theory, the second one includes works on linear differential equations and on the Gamma function, while the last one includes his contributions to actuarial science. Pinl & Dick (1974, p. 202) give a more detailed list of research topics Tauber worked on, though it is restricted to mathematical analysis and geometric topics: some of them are infinite series, Fourier series, spherical harmonics, the theory of quaternions, analytic and descriptive geometry. Tauber's most important scientific contributions belong to the first of his research areas, even if his work on potential theory has been overshadowed by that of Aleksandr Lyapunov.

=== Tauberian theorems ===
His most important article is (Tauber 1897). In this paper, he succeeded in proving a converse to Abel's theorem for the first time: this result was the starting point of numerous investigations, leading to the proof and to applications of several theorems of such kind for various summability methods. The statement of these theorems has a standard structure: if a series ∑ a_{n} is summable according to a given summability method and satisfies an additional condition, called "Tauberian condition", then it is a convergent series. Starting from 1913 onward, G. H. Hardy and J. E. Littlewood used the term Tauberian to identify this class of theorems. Describing with a little more detail Tauber's 1897 work, it can be said that his main achievements are the following two theorems:

Tauber's first theorem. If the series ∑ a_{n} is Abel summable to sum s, i.e. lim_{x→ 1^{−}} ∑+∞
n=0 a_{n} x^{n} = s, and if moreover a_{n} = ο(n^{−1}), then ∑ a_{k} converges to s.

This theorem is, according to Korevaar (2004, p. 10), the forerunner of all Tauberian theory: the condition a_{n} = ο(n^{−1}) is the first Tauberian condition, which later had many profound generalizations. In the remaining part of his paper, by using the theorem above, Tauber proved the following, more general result:

Tauber's second theorem. The series ∑ a_{n} converges to sum s if and only if the two following conditions are satisfied:

1. ∑ a_{n} is Abel summable and
2. ∑n
  k=1 k a_{k} = ο(n).

This result is not a trivial consequence of Tauber's first theorem. The greater generality of this result with respect to the former one is due to the fact it proves the exact equivalence between ordinary convergence on one side and Abel summability (condition 1) jointly with Tauberian condition (condition 2) on the other. Chatterji (1984, pp. 169–170) claims that this latter result must have appeared to Tauber much more complete and satisfying respect to the former one as it states a necessary and sufficient condition for the convergence of a series while the former one was simply a stepping stone to it: the only reason why Tauber's second theorem is not mentioned very often seems to be that it has no profound generalization as the first one has, though it has its rightful place in all detailed developments of summability of series.

=== Contributions to the theory of Hilbert transform ===
Frederick W. King (2009, p. 3) writes that Tauber contributed at an early stage to theory of the "Hilbert transform", as it is now called, anticipating with his contribution the works of Hilbert and Hardy in such a way that the transform should perhaps bear their three names. Precisely, Tauber (1891) considers the real part φ and imaginary part ψ of a power series f,

$$f(z)=\sum_{k=1}^{+\infty} c_kz^k =\varphi(\theta)+\mathrm{i} \psi(\theta)$$

where

- z = re^{iθ} with r = | z | being the absolute value of the given complex variable,
- c_{k} r^{k} = a_{k} + ib_{k} for every natural number k,
- φ(θ) = ∑+∞
  k=1 a_{k}cos(kθ) − b_{k}sin(kθ) and ψ(θ) = ∑+∞
  k=1 a_{k}sin(kθ) + b_{k}cos(kθ) are trigonometric series and therefore periodic functions, expressing the real and imaginary part of the given power series.

Under the hypothesis that r is less than the convergence radius R_{f} of the power series f, Tauber proves that φ and ψ satisfy the two following equations:

(1) $\varphi(\theta)=\frac{1}{2\pi}\int_0^\pi \left\{\psi(\theta+\phi) - \psi(\theta-\phi)\right\}\cot\left(\frac{\phi}{2}\right)\,\mathrm{d}\phi$

(2) $\psi(\theta)=-\frac{1}{2\pi}\int_0^\pi \left\{\varphi(\theta+\phi) - \varphi(\theta-\phi)\right\}\cot\left(\frac{\phi}{2}\right)\mathrm{d}\phi$

Assuming then r = R_{f}, he is also able to prove that the above equations still hold if φ and ψ are only absolutely integrable: this result is equivalent to defining the Hilbert transform on the circle since, after some calculations exploiting the periodicity of the functions involved, it can be proved that (1) and (2) are equivalent to the following pair of Hilbert transforms:

$$\varphi(\theta)=\frac{1}{2\pi}\int_{-\pi}^\pi \psi(\phi) \cot\left(\frac{\theta-\phi}{2}\right)\mathrm{d}\phi \qquad
\psi(\theta)=\frac{1}{2\pi}\int_{-\pi}^\pi \varphi(\phi) \cot\left(\frac{\theta-\phi}{2}\right)\mathrm{d}\phi$$

Finally, it is perhaps worth pointing out an application of the results of (Tauber 1891), given (without proof) by Tauber himself in the short research announcement (Tauber 1895):

the complex valued continuous function φ(θ) + iψ(θ) defined on a given circle is the boundary value of a holomorphic function defined in its open disk if and only if the two following conditions are satisfied

1. the function [φ(θ − α) − φ(θ + α)]/α is uniformly integrable in every neighborhood of the point α = 0, and
2. the function ψ(θ) satisfies (2).

== Selected publications ==
- Tauber, Alfred (1891), "Über den Zusammenhang des reellen und imaginären Theiles einer Potenzreihe" [On the relation between real and imaginary part of a power series], Monatshefte für Mathematik und Physik, II: 79–118, doi:10.1007/bf01691828, JFM 23.0251.01, S2CID 120241651.
- Tauber, Alfred (1895), "Ueber die Werte einer analytischen Function längs einer Kreislinie" [On the values of an analytic function along a circular perimeter], Jahresbericht der Deutschen Mathematiker-Vereinigung, 4: 115, archived from the original on 2015-07-01.
- Tauber, Alfred (1897), "Ein Satz aus der Theorie der unendlichen Reihen" [A theorem about infinite series], Monatshefte für Mathematik und Physik, VIII: 273–277, doi:10.1007/BF01696278, JFM 28.0221.02, S2CID 120692627.
- Tauber, Alfred (1898), "Über einige Sätze der Potentialtheorie" [Some theorems of potential theory], Monatshefte für Mathematik und Physik, IX: 79–118, doi:10.1007/BF01707858, JFM 29.0654.02, S2CID 124400762.
- Tauber, Alfred (1920), "Über konvergente und asymptotische Darstellung des Integrallogarithmus" [On convergent and asymptotic representation of the logarithmic integral function], Mathematische Zeitschrift, 8 (1–2): 52–62, doi:10.1007/bf01212858, JFM 47.0329.01, S2CID 119967249.
- Tauber, Alfred (1922), "Über die Umwandlung von Potenzreihen in Kettenbrüche" [On the conversion of power series into continued fractions], Mathematische Zeitschrift, 15: 66–80, doi:10.1007/bf01494383, JFM 48.0236.01, S2CID 122501264.

== See also ==
- Actuarial science
- Hardy–Littlewood tauberian theorem
- Summability theory
