= Ernst Fiedler =

Swiss mathematician

- Born: 22 July 1861; Chemnitz, Germany
- Died: 16 July 1954 (aged 92); Zürich, Switzerland
- Resting place: Enzenbühl cemetery (Zürich); 47.349479°N 8.581422°E
- Education: University of Leipzig; ETH Zurich
- Spouse: Lina Knoch
- Parent(s): Wilhelm Fiedler and Elise Springer
- Scientific career
- Fields: Mathematics
- Workplaces: Kantonsschule Rämibühl
- Thesis: Über eine besondere Klasse irrationaler Modulargleichungen der elliptischen Funktionen (1885)
- Doctoral advisor: Felix Klein, Wilhelm Wundt

Ernst Fiedler (22 July 1861 – 16 July 1954) was a German-born Swiss mathematician.

== Life and work ==
Fiedler was the son of Wilhelm Fiedler, mathematics professor at ETH Zurich from 1867. From 1879 to 1882 he studied mathematics at ETH Zurich; in 1882 he moved to Berlin where he studied under Weierstrass, Frobenius and other outstanding mathematicians. In 1885 he moved to Leipzig, where he was awarded a doctorate under Felix Klein in 1885.

Returned to Zürich, he was privatdozent at ETH Zurich. In 1889 he was named full professor at the Industrieschule (in 1904 renamed as Oberrealschule, and now Kantonsschule Rämibühl). He was the principal of the school from 1904 to 1926 when he retired.

Fiedler only produced some secondary school textbooks and no research papers. But he has left some lecture notes on courses given by his father and other professors like Weierstrass.

He also joined the Swiss Army and became the youngest colonel in the army. From 1889 he lectured on ballistics at the Polytechnicum. He was also member of a number of committees to improve the secondary schools.

== Bibliography ==
- Eminger, Stefanie Ursula (2015). Carl Friedrich Geiser and Ferdinand Rudio: The Men Behind the First International Congress of Mathematicians (PDF). St Andrews University.
- Oswald, Nicola; Volkert, Klaus (2018). "A Glimpse of Sources for Historical Studies at the ETH Archive in Zürich". EMS Newsletter. 9 (109): 28–33. doi:10.4171/NEWS/109/7. ISSN 1027-488X.
- Volkert, Klaus (2018). "Vater und Sohn". Mathematische Semesterberichte (in German). 65 (2): 137–152. doi:10.1007/s00591-018-0227-6. ISSN 0720-728X. S2CID 125826660.
