= Wilhelm Fiedler =

German-Swiss mathematician

Otto Wilhelm Fiedler
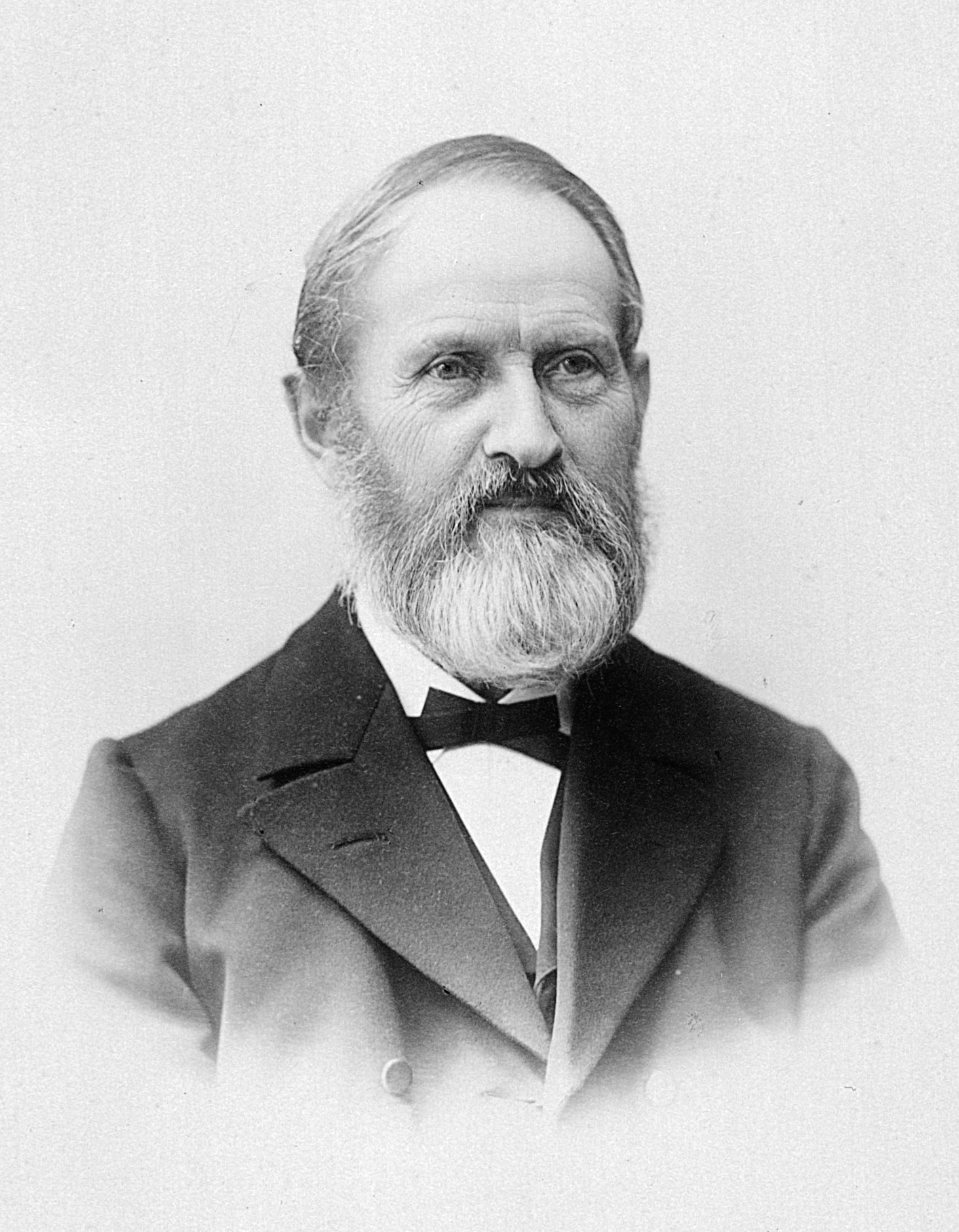
- Born: 3 April 1832; Chemnitz
- Died: 19 November 1912 (aged 80); Zurich
- Education: University of Leipzig
- Awards: Steiner price
- Scientific career
- Fields: Mathematics
- Thesis: Die Zentralprojektion als geometrische Wissenschaft
- Doctoral advisor: August Ferdinand Möbius; Wilhelm Gottlieb Hankel
- Notable students: Marcel Grossmann; Emil Weyr

Otto Wilhelm Fiedler (3 April 1832 in Chemnitz – 19 November 1912 in Zurich) was a German-Swiss mathematician, known for his textbooks of geometry and his contributions to descriptive geometry.

== Life ==
Fiedler was the son of a shoemaker. He went to the Royal Mercantile College in Chemnitz and in 1849 to the Bergakademie Freiberg as an external student. In 1852 he became a mathematics teacher at the "Werkmeisterschule" in Freiberg and 1853 at the "Gewerbeschule" in Chemnitz. He had to take care of his widowed mother and his siblings, and educated himself without directly attending a university. In 1858 he obtained the doctorate in mathematics at the University of Leipzig under August Ferdinand Möbius (Die Zentralprojektion als geometrische Wissenschaft).

Fiedler made himself known by editing the translation of the textbooks of analytic, projective, and algebraic geometry by George Salmon (in the 19th century known in Germany as "Salmon-Fiedler"). He was a friend of Salmon and studied his theological works after he retired.

In 1864 he became professor for descriptive geometry at the Czech Technical University in Prague and 1867 professor at the Federal polytechnic school in Zurich (by the mediation of Karl Culmann). In 1907 he retired. Among his students were Marcel Grossmann and Emil Weyr. Hendrik de Vries was his assistant.

He was a member of the Leopoldina (1889) and the Bavarian Academy of Sciences and Humanities (1906). He obtained in 1884 the Steiner price of the Prussian Academy of Sciences, and in 1907 the Honorary degree of the Vienna University of Technology was awarded to him.

In 1860 he married Line Elise née Springer. In 1875, he was naturalized in Zurich. His son Ernst (1861–1954) was professor of mathematics and rector of the "Oberrealschule" (today Kantonsschule Rämibühl) in Zurich. His son Karl (1863–1894) was Privatdozent for zoology in Zurich.

== Publications ==
- with George Salmon: Analytische Geometrie der Kegelschnitte mit besonderer Berücksichtigung der neueren Methoden, Teubner 1860, 2. Auflage 1866 (Scan), 5. Auflage in 2 Teilen 1887/88 (Tl. 1, Tl. 2), 7. Auflage 1907
- Die Elemente der neueren Geometrie und die Algebra der binären Formen: Ein Beitrag zur Einführung in die Algebra der linearen Transformationen, Teubner 1862 (Scan)
- with George Salmon: Vorlesungen zur Einführung in die Algebra der linearen Transformationen, Teubner 1863, 3. Auflage 1878
- with George Salmon: Analytische Geometrie des Raumes, 2 Bände, Teubner 1863, 1865, 4. Auflage, 1898
  - Band 1: Die Elemente der analytischen Geometrie des Raumes und die Theorie der Flächen zweiten Grades
  - Band 2: Analytische Geometrie der Curven im Raume und der algebraischen Flächen
- Die darstellende Geometrie in organischer Verbindung mit der Geometrie der Lage, Teubner 1871, 3. Auflage in drei Bänden 1883–1888
  - Band 1: Die Methoden der darstellenden und die Elemente der projectivischen Geometrie: für Vorlesungen und zum Selbststudium
  - Band 2: Die darstellende Geometrie der krummen Linien und Flächen
  - Band 3: Die constituirende und analytische Geometrie der Lage
- with George Salmon: Analytische Geometrie der höheren ebenen Kurven, Teubner 1873, 2. Auflage 1882
- Cyklographie oder Construction der Aufgaben über Kreise und Kugeln und elementare Geometrie der Kreis- und Kugelsysteme, Teubner 1882 (Scan)
- Meine Mitarbeit an der Reform der darstellenden Geometrie in neuerer Zeit. In: Jahresbericht der Deutschen Mathematiker-Vereinigung. Bd. 14 (1905), S. 493–503 (Scan).
