= On Formally Undecidable Propositions of Principia Mathematica and Related Systems =

1931 paper by Kurt Gödel

"Über formal unentscheidbare Sätze der Principia Mathematica und verwandter Systeme I" ("On Formally Undecidable Propositions of Principia Mathematica and Related Systems I") is a paper in mathematical logic by Kurt Gödel. Submitted November 17, 1930, it was originally published in German in the 1931 volume of Monatshefte für Mathematik und Physik. Several English translations have appeared in print, and the paper has been included in two collections of classic mathematical logic papers. The paper contains Gödel's incompleteness theorems, now fundamental results in logic that have many implications for consistency proofs in mathematics. The paper is also known for introducing new techniques that Gödel invented to prove the incompleteness theorems.

== Outline and key results ==
The main results established are Gödel's first and second incompleteness theorems, which have had an enormous impact on the field of mathematical logic. These appear as theorems VI and XI, respectively, in the paper.

In order to prove these results, Gödel introduced a method now known as Gödel numbering. In this method, each sentence and formal proof in first-order arithmetic is assigned a particular natural number. Gödel shows that many properties of these proofs can be defined within any theory of arithmetic that is strong enough to define the primitive recursive functions. (The contemporary terminology for recursive functions and primitive recursive functions had not yet been established when the paper was published; Gödel used the word rekursiv ("recursive") for what are now known as primitive recursive functions.) The method of Gödel numbering has since become common in mathematical logic.

Because the method of Gödel numbering was novel, and to avoid any ambiguity, Gödel presented a list of 45 explicit formal definitions of primitive recursive functions and relations used to manipulate and test Gödel numbers. He used these to give an explicit definition of a formula Bew(x) that is true if and only if x is the Gödel number of a sentence φ and there exists a natural number that is the Gödel number of a proof of φ. The name of this formula derives from Beweis, the German word for proof.

A second new technique invented by Gödel in this paper was the use of self-referential sentences. Gödel showed that the classical paradoxes of self-reference, such as "This statement is false", can be recast as self-referential formal sentences of arithmetic. Informally, the sentence employed to prove Gödel's first incompleteness theorem says "This statement is not provable." The fact that such self-reference can be expressed within arithmetic was not known until Gödel's paper appeared; independent work of Alfred Tarski on his indefinability theorem was conducted around the same time but not published until 1936.

In footnote 48a, Gödel stated that a planned second part of the paper would establish a link between consistency proofs and type theory (hence the "I" at the end of the paper's title, denoting the first part), but Gödel did not publish a second part of the paper before his death. His 1958 paper in Dialectica did, however, show how type theory can be used to give a consistency proof for arithmetic.

== Published English translations ==
During his lifetime three English translations of Gödel's paper were printed, but the process was not without difficulty. The first English translation was by Bernard Meltzer; it was published in 1963 as a standalone work by Basic Books and has since been reprinted by Dover and reprinted by Hawking (God Created the Integers, Running Press, 2005:1097ff). The Meltzer version—described by Raymond Smullyan as a 'nice translation'—was adversely reviewed by Stefan Bauer-Mengelberg (1966). According to Dawson's biography of Gödel (Dawson 1997:216),

Fortunately, the Meltzer translation was soon supplanted by a better one prepared by Elliott Mendelson for Martin Davis's anthology The Undecidable; but it too was not brought to Gödel's attention until almost the last minute, and the new translation was still not wholly to his liking ... when informed that there was not time enough to consider substituting another text, he declared that Mendelson's translation was 'on the whole very good' and agreed to its publication. [Afterward he would regret his compliance, for the published volume was marred throughout by sloppy typography and numerous misprints.]

The translation by Elliott Mendelson appears in the collection The Undecidable (Davis 1965:5ff). This translation also received a harsh review by Bauer-Mengelberg (1966), who in addition to giving a detailed list of the typographical errors also described what he believed to be serious errors in the translation.

A translation by Jean van Heijenoort appears in the collection From Frege to Gödel: A Source Book in Mathematical Logic (van Heijenoort 1967). A review by Alonzo Church (1972) described this as "the most careful translation that has been made" but also gave some specific criticisms of it. Dawson (1997:216) notes:

The translation Gödel favored was that by Jean van Heijenoort ... In the preface to the volume van Heijenoort noted that Gödel was one of four authors who had personally read and approved the translations of his works.

This approval process was laborious. Gödel introduced changes to his text of 1931, and negotiations between the men were "protracted": "Privately van Heijenoort declared that Gödel was the most doggedly fastidious individual he had ever known." Between them they "exchanged a total of seventy letters and met twice in Gödel's office in order to resolve questions concerning subtleties in the meanings and usage of German and English words." (Dawson 1997:216-217).

Although not a translation of the original paper, a very useful 4th version exists that "cover[s] ground quite similar to that covered by Godel's original 1931 paper on undecidability" (Davis 1952:39), as well as Gödel's own extensions of and commentary on the topic. This appears as On Undecidable Propositions of Formal Mathematical Systems (Davis 1965:39ff) and represents the lectures as transcribed by Stephen Kleene and J. Barkley Rosser while Gödel delivered them at the Institute for Advanced Study in Princeton, New Jersey in 1934. Two pages of errata and additional corrections by Gödel were added by Davis to this version. This version is also notable because in it Gödel first describes the Herbrand suggestion that gave rise to the (general, i.e. Herbrand–Gödel) form of recursion.
