= Kurt Gödel =

Mathematician and philosopher (1906–1978)

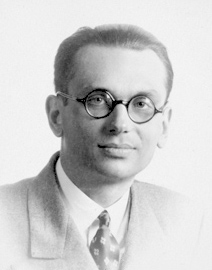
- Gödel, c. 1926
- Born: Kurt Friedrich Gödel; April 28, 1906; Brünn, Austria-Hungary
- Died: January 14, 1978 (aged 71); Princeton, New Jersey, U.S.
- Cause of death: Starvation due to a persecutory delusion
- Citizenship: Austria; Czechoslovakia; Germany; United States
- Education: University of Vienna (Dr. phil., 1930)
- Known for: Gödel's incompleteness theorems; Gödel's completeness theorem; Gödel's constructible universe; Gödel metric (closed timelike curve); Gödel logic; Gödel–Dummett logic; Gödel's β function; Gödel's Loophole; Gödel numbering; Gödel operation; Gödel's speed-up theorem; Gödel's ontological proof; Gödel–Gentzen translation; Gödel–McKinsey–Tarski translation; Von Neumann–Bernays–Gödel set theory; ω-consistent theory; The consistency of the continuum hypothesis with ZFC; Axiom of constructibility; Compactness theorem; Condensation lemma; Diagonal lemma; Dialectica interpretation; Ordinal definable set; Slingshot argument
- Spouse: Adele Nimbursky (m. 1938)
- Awards: Albert Einstein Award (1951); ForMemRS (1968); National Medal of Science (1974)
- Scientific career
- Fields: Mathematics, mathematical logic, physics
- Workplaces: University of Vienna; Institute for Advanced Study
- Thesis: Über die Vollständigkeit des Logikkalküls (1929)
- Doctoral advisor: Hans Hahn
- Other academic advisors: Karl Menger
- Notable students: Gaisi Takeuti

Philosophical work
- Era: 20th-century philosophy
- Region: Western philosophy
- School: Analytic philosophy
- Main interests: Philosophy of logic; Philosophy of mathematics; Philosophy of religion; General relativity

Kurt Friedrich Gödel (/ˈɡɜːrdəl, ˈɡʌdəl/ GUR-dəl, GUH-dəl; German: [ˈkʊʁt ˈɡøːdl̩]; April 28, 1906 – January 14, 1978) was a logician, mathematician, cosmologist, and philosopher. Considered along with Aristotle and Gottlob Frege to be one of the most significant logicians in history, Gödel profoundly influenced scientific and philosophical thinking in the 20th century (at a time when Bertrand Russell, Alfred North Whitehead, and David Hilbert were using logic and set theory to investigate the foundations of mathematics), building on earlier work by Frege, Richard Dedekind, and Georg Cantor.

Gödel's discoveries in the foundations of mathematics led to the proof of his completeness theorem in 1929 as part of his dissertation to earn a doctorate at the University of Vienna, and the publication of Gödel's incompleteness theorems two years later, in 1931. The incompleteness theorems address limitations of formal axiomatic systems. In particular, they imply that a formal axiomatic system satisfying certain technical conditions cannot decide the truth value of all statements about the natural numbers, and cannot prove that it is itself consistent. To prove this, Gödel developed a technique now known as Gödel numbering, which codes formal expressions as natural numbers.

Gödel also showed that neither the axiom of choice nor the continuum hypothesis can be disproved from the accepted Zermelo–Fraenkel set theory, assuming that its axioms are consistent. The former result opened the door for mathematicians to assume the axiom of choice in their proofs. He also made important contributions to proof theory by clarifying the connections between classical logic, intuitionistic logic, and modal logic.

Born into a wealthy German-speaking family in Brno, Gödel emigrated to the United States in 1939 to escape the rise of Nazi Germany. Later in life, he suffered from mental illness; believing that his food was being poisoned, he refused to eat and starved to death.

== Early life and education ==
=== Childhood ===
Gödel was born on April 28, 1906, in Brünn, Austria-Hungary (now Brno, Czech Republic), into the German-speaking family of Rudolf Gödel, the managing director and part owner of a major textile firm, (Note: The factory was involved in wool trade - originally founded by Friedrich Redlich (1828, Brno – 1893/4, Brno) 1850 for worsted yarn imported from England, France and Belgium - had a weaving mill and finishing shop, no spinning mill.) and Marianne Gödel (née Handschuh). His father was Catholic and his mother was Protestant, and the children were raised as Protestants. Many of Kurt Gödel's ancestors were active in Brünn's cultural life. For example, his grandfather Joseph Gödel was a famous singer in his time and for some years a member of the Brünner Männergesangverein (Men's Choral Union of Brünn).

Gödel automatically became a citizen of Czechoslovakia at age 12 when the Austro-Hungarian Empire collapsed following its defeat in the First World War. According to his classmate Klepetař, like many residents of the predominantly German Sudetenländer, "Gödel considered himself always Austrian and an exile in Czechoslovakia". In February 1929, he was granted release from his Czechoslovak citizenship and then, in April, granted Austrian citizenship. When Germany annexed Austria in 1938, Gödel automatically became a German citizen at age 32. In 1948, after World War II, at age 42, he became a U.S. citizen.

In his family, the young Gödel was nicknamed Herr Warum ("Mr. Why") because of his insatiable curiosity. According to his brother Rudolf, at the age of six or seven, Kurt suffered from rheumatic fever; he completely recovered, but remained convinced for the rest of his life that his heart had been permanently damaged. Beginning at age four, Gödel had "frequent episodes of poor health", which continued all his life.

Gödel attended the Evangelische Volksschule, a Lutheran school in Brünn, from 1912 to 1916, and was enrolled in the Deutsches Staats-Realgymnasium from 1916 to 1924, excelling with honors in all subjects, particularly mathematics, languages, and religion. Although he had first excelled in languages, he became more interested in history and mathematics. His interest in mathematics increased when in 1920 his older brother Rudolf left for Vienna, where he attended medical school at the University of Vienna. During his teens, Gödel studied Gabelsberger shorthand, criticism of Isaac Newton, and the writings of Immanuel Kant.

=== Studies in Vienna ===
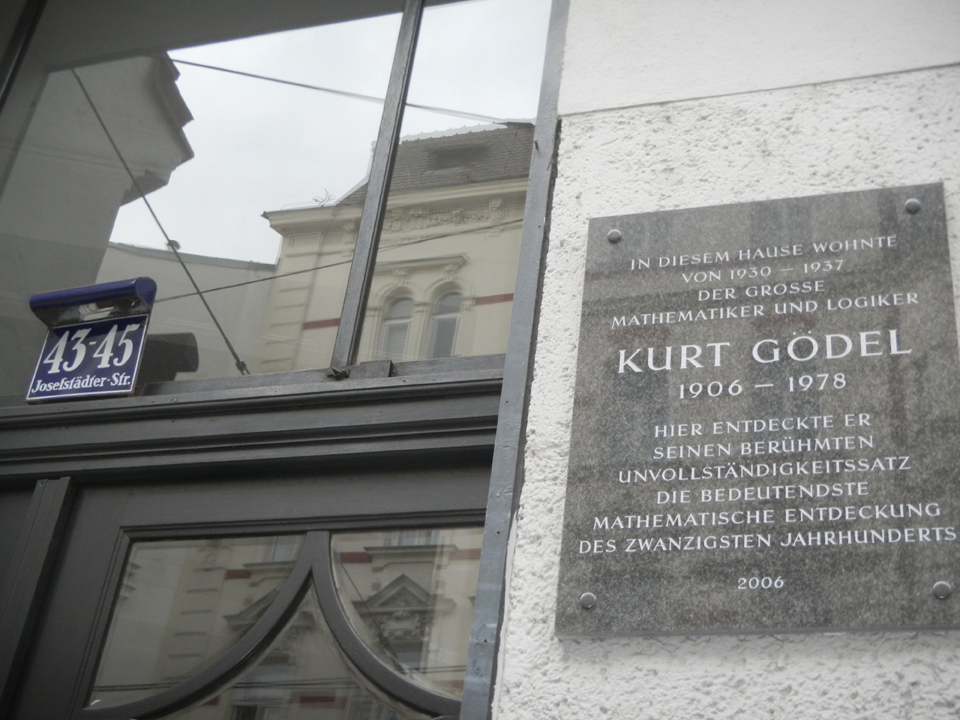
Plaque to Gödel at 43-45 Josefstädter Straße, Vienna, where he discovered his incompleteness theorems

At age 18, Gödel joined his brother at the University of Vienna. He had already mastered university-level mathematics. Although initially intending to study theoretical physics, he also attended courses on mathematics and philosophy. During this time, he adopted ideas of mathematical realism. He read Kant's Metaphysische Anfangsgründe der Naturwissenschaft, and participated in the Vienna Circle with Moritz Schlick, Hans Hahn, and Rudolf Carnap. Gödel then studied number theory, but when he took part in a seminar run by Moritz Schlick that studied Bertrand Russell's book Introduction to Mathematical Philosophy, he became interested in mathematical logic. According to Gödel, mathematical logic was "a science prior to all others, which contains the ideas and principles underlying all sciences."

Attending a lecture by David Hilbert in Bologna on completeness and consistency in mathematical systems may have set Gödel's life course. In 1928, Hilbert and Wilhelm Ackermann published Grundzüge der theoretischen Logik (Principles of Mathematical Logic), an introduction to first-order logic in which the problem of completeness was posed: "Are the axioms of a formal system sufficient to derive every statement that is true in all models of the system?"

Gödel chose this topic for his doctoral work. In 1929, aged 23, he completed his doctoral dissertation under Hans Hahn's supervision. In it, he established his eponymous completeness theorem regarding first-order logic. He was awarded his doctorate in 1930, and his thesis (accompanied by additional work) was published by the Vienna Academy of Science.

In 1929 Gödel met Adele Nimbursky (née Porkert), a divorcee living with her parents across the street from him. The two married (in a civil ceremony) a decade later, in September 1938. A trained ballet dancer, Adele was working as a masseuse at the time they met. At one point she worked as a dancer at a downtown nightclub called the Nachtfalter ("nocturnal moth"). Gödel's parents opposed their relationship because of her background and age (six years older than he). It appears to have been a happy marriage. Adele was an important support to Gödel, whose psychological problems affected their daily lives. The two had no children.

== Career ==
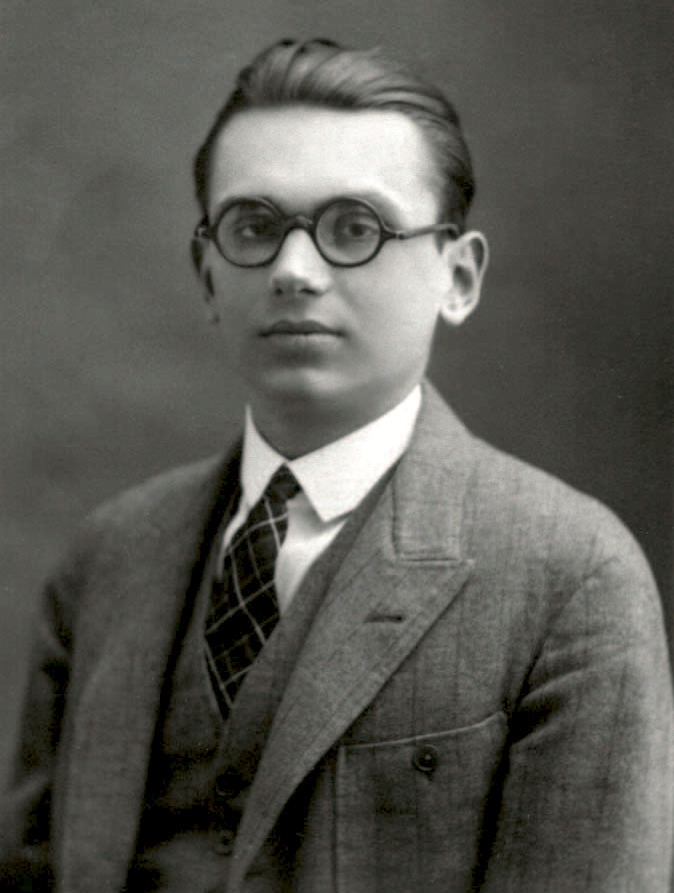
Gödel as a student in 1925

=== Incompleteness theorems ===
Kurt Gödel's achievement in modern logic is singular and monumental—indeed it is more than a monument, it is a landmark which will remain visible far in space and time. ... The subject of logic has certainly completely changed its nature and possibilities with Gödel's achievement.

— John von Neumann

In 1930 Gödel attended the Second Conference on the Epistemology of the Exact Sciences, held in Königsberg on September 5–7. There, he presented his completeness theorem of first-order logic, and, at the end of the talk, mentioned that this result does not generalise to higher-order logic, thus hinting at his incompleteness theorems.

Gödel published his incompleteness theorems in Über formal unentscheidbare Sätze der Principia Mathematica und verwandter Systeme (called in English "On Formally Undecidable Propositions of Principia Mathematica and Related Systems"). In that article, he proved for any computable axiomatic system powerful enough to describe the arithmetic of the natural numbers (e.g., the Peano axioms or Zermelo–Fraenkel set theory with the axiom of choice), that:

1. If a (logical or axiomatic formal) system is omega-consistent, it cannot be syntactically complete.
2. The consistency of axioms cannot be proved within their own system.

These theorems ended a half-century of attempts, beginning with the work of Frege and culminating in Principia Mathematica and Hilbert's program, to find a non-relatively consistent axiomatization sufficient for number theory (that was to serve as the foundation for other fields of mathematics).

Gödel constructed a formula that claims it is itself unprovable in a given formal system. If it were provable, it would be false. Thus there will always be at least one true but unprovable statement. That is, for any computably enumerable set of axioms for arithmetic (that is, a set that can in principle be printed out by an idealized computer with unlimited resources), there is a formula that is true of arithmetic, but not provable in that system. To make this precise, Gödel had to produce a method to encode (as natural numbers) statements, proofs, and the concept of provability; he did this by a process known as Gödel numbering.

In his two-page paper Zum intuitionistischen Aussagenkalkül (1932), Gödel refuted the finite-valuedness of intuitionistic logic. In the proof, he implicitly used what has later become known as Gödel–Dummett intermediate logic (or Gödel fuzzy logic).

=== Mid-1930s: further work and U.S. visits ===
Gödel earned his habilitation at Vienna in 1932, and in 1933 became a Privatdozent (unpaid lecturer) there. In 1933, Adolf Hitler came to power in Germany, and over the following years the Nazis rose in influence in Austria and among Vienna's mathematicians. In June 1936, Moritz Schlick, whose seminar had aroused Gödel's interest in logic, was murdered by one of his former students, Johann Nelböck. This triggered "a severe nervous crisis" in Gödel. He developed paranoid symptoms, including a fear of being poisoned, and spent several months in a sanitarium for nervous diseases.

In 1933, Gödel first traveled to the U.S., where he met Albert Einstein, who became a good friend. He delivered an address to the annual meeting of the American Mathematical Society. During this year, Gödel also developed the ideas of computability and recursive functions to the point that he was able to present a lecture on general recursive functions and the concept of truth. This work was developed in number theory, using Gödel numbering.

In 1934, Gödel gave a series of lectures at the Institute for Advanced Study (IAS) in Princeton, New Jersey, titled On undecidable propositions of formal mathematical systems. Stephen Kleene, who had just completed his PhD at Princeton, took notes on these lectures that were later published.

Gödel visited the IAS again in the autumn of 1935. The traveling and hard work had exhausted him and the next year he took a break to recover from a depressive episode. He returned to teaching in 1937. During this time, he worked on the proof of consistency of the axiom of choice and of the continuum hypothesis; he went on to show that these hypotheses cannot be disproved from the common system of axioms of set theory.

After marrying Adele Nimbursky in 1938, he visited the U.S. again, spending the autumn of 1938 at the IAS and publishing Consistency of the axiom of choice and of the generalized continuum-hypothesis with the axioms of set theory, a classic of modern mathematics. In it, he introduced the constructible universe, a model of set theory in which the only sets that exist are those that can be constructed from simpler sets. Gödel showed that both the axiom of choice (AC) and the generalized continuum hypothesis (GCH) are true in the constructible universe, and therefore must be consistent with the Zermelo–Fraenkel axioms for set theory (ZF). This result has considerable consequences for working mathematicians, as it means they can assume the axiom of choice when proving the Hahn–Banach theorem. Paul Cohen later constructed a model of ZF in which AC and GCH are false; together these proofs mean that AC and GCH are independent of the ZF axioms for set theory.

Gödel spent the spring of 1939 at the University of Notre Dame.

=== Princeton, Einstein, U.S. citizenship ===
After the Anschluss on March 12, 1938, Austria became a part of Nazi Germany. Germany abolished the title Privatdozent, so Gödel had to apply for a different position under the new order. His former association with Jewish members of the Vienna Circle, especially Hahn, weighed against him. The University of Vienna turned his application down.

His predicament worsened when the German army found him fit for conscription. World War II started in September 1939. Before the year was up, Gödel and his wife left Vienna for Princeton. To avoid the difficulty of an Atlantic crossing, the Gödels took the Trans-Siberian Railway to the Pacific, sailed from Japan to San Francisco (which they reached on March 4, 1940), then traveled to Princeton by train. During this trip, Gödel was supposed to be carrying a secret letter to Einstein from Viennese physicist Hans Thirring to alert President Franklin D. Roosevelt of the possibility that Hitler was making an atom bomb. Gödel never conveyed that letter to Einstein, although they did meet, because he was not convinced Hitler could achieve this feat. In any case, Leo Szilard had already conveyed the message to Einstein, and Einstein had already warned Roosevelt.

In Princeton, Gödel accepted a position at the Institute for Advanced Study (IAS), which he had visited during 1933–34.

Einstein was also living in Princeton during this time. Gödel and Einstein developed a strong friendship, and were known to take long walks together to and from the IAS. The nature of their conversations was a mystery to the other Institute members. Economist Oskar Morgenstern recounts that toward the end of Einstein's life, Einstein confided that his "own work no longer meant much, that he came to the Institute merely ... to have the privilege of walking home with Gödel".

Gödel and his wife spent the summer of 1942 in Blue Hill, Maine, at the Blue Hill Inn at the top of the bay. Gödel had a very productive summer of work. Using Heft 15 [volume 15] of Gödel's still-unpublished Arbeitshefte [working notebooks], John W. Dawson Jr. conjectures that Gödel discovered a proof for the independence of the axiom of choice from finite type theory, a weakened form of set theory, while in Blue Hill in 1942. Gödel's close friend Hao Wang supports this conjecture, noting that Gödel's Blue Hill notebooks contain his most extensive treatment of the problem.

On December 5, 1947, Einstein and Morgenstern accompanied Gödel to his U.S. citizenship exam, where they acted as witnesses. Gödel had confided in them that he had discovered an inconsistency in the U.S. Constitution that could allow the U.S. to become a dictatorship; this has since been dubbed Gödel's loophole. Einstein and Morgenstern were concerned that their friend's unpredictable behavior might jeopardize his application. The judge turned out to be Phillip Forman, who knew Einstein and had administered the oath at Einstein's own citizenship hearing. Everything went smoothly until Forman happened to ask Gödel if he thought a dictatorship like the Nazi regime could happen in the U.S. Gödel then started to explain his discovery to Forman. Forman understood what was going on, cut Gödel off, and moved the hearing on to other questions and a routine conclusion.

Gödel became a permanent member of the Institute for Advanced Study at Princeton in 1946. He became a full professor at the Institute in 1953 and an emeritus professor in 1976.

In a 1956 letter to John von Neumann, Gödel asked whether theorem-proving (now known to be co-NP-complete) could be solved in quadratic or linear time, which anticipated the P versus NP problem.

During his time at the institute, Gödel's interests turned to philosophy and physics. In 1949, he demonstrated the existence of solutions involving closed timelike curves, to Einstein's field equations in general relativity. He is said to have given this elaboration to Einstein as a present for his 70th birthday. His "rotating universes" would allow time travel to the past and caused Einstein to have doubts about his own theory. His solutions are known as the Gödel metric (an exact solution of the Einstein field equation).

Gödel studied and admired the work of Gottfried Leibniz, but came to believe that a hostile conspiracy had caused some of Leibniz's work to be suppressed. To a lesser extent he studied Kant and Edmund Husserl. Gödel defended mathematical Platonism throughout his career, and was one of the first people to emphasize the importance of large cardinals in set theory. In the early 1970s, Gödel circulated among his friends an elaboration of Leibniz's version of Anselm of Canterbury's ontological argument for God's existence. This is now known as Gödel's ontological proof.

== Awards and honours ==
Gödel was awarded (with Julian Schwinger) the first Albert Einstein Award in 1951 and the National Medal of Science in 1974. Gödel was elected a resident member of the American Philosophical Society in 1961 and a Foreign Member of the Royal Society (ForMemRS) in 1968. He was a Plenary Speaker at the International Congress of Mathematicians in 1950 in Cambridge, Massachusetts.

== Personal life and death ==
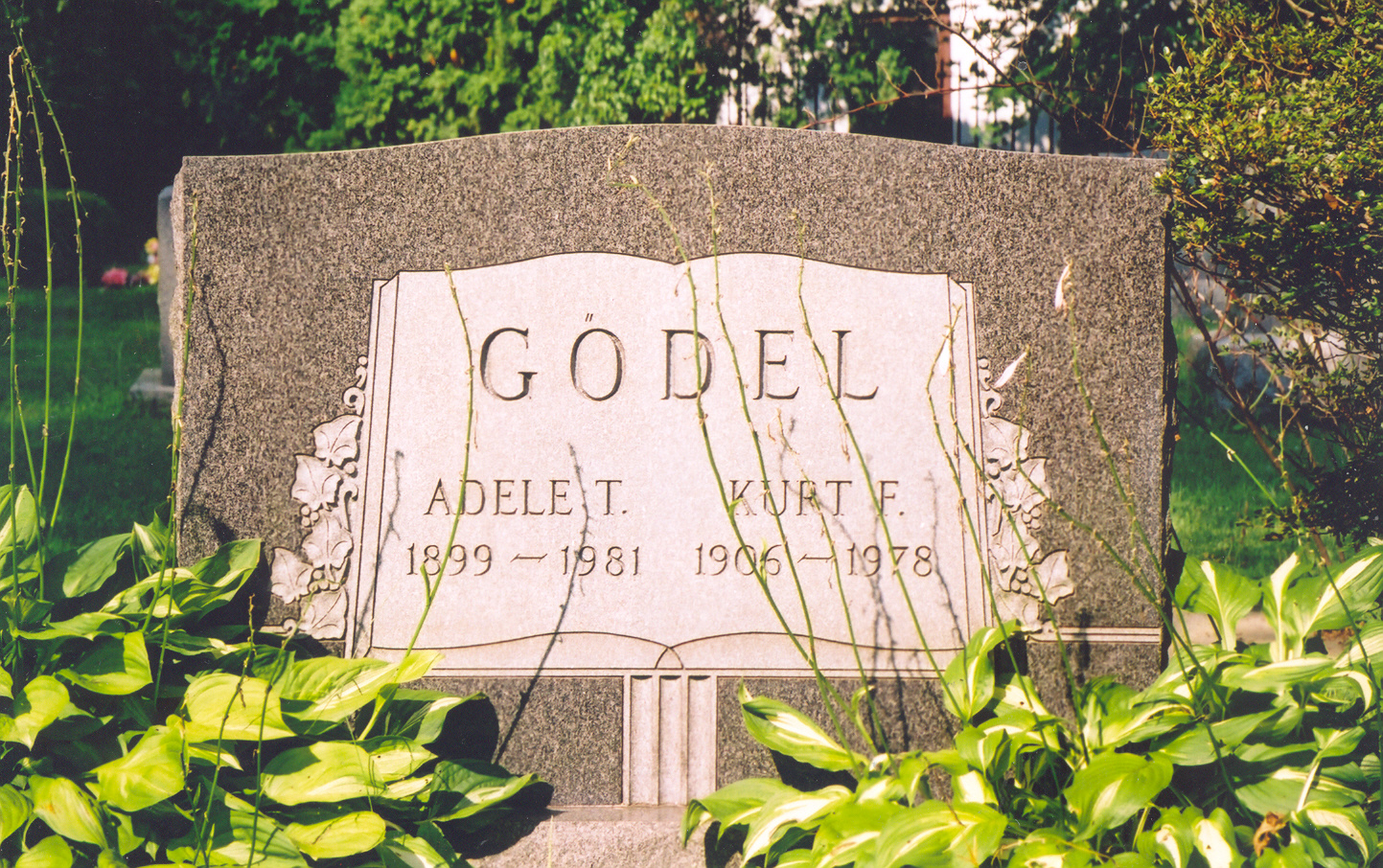
Gravestone of Kurt and Adele Gödel in the Princeton, N.J., cemetery

Gödel married Adele Nimbursky in Vienna in 1938. They emigrated to the United States a year later.

In his later life, Gödel suffered periods of mental instability and illness. Some scholars have suggested obsessive-compulsive disorder as a diagnosis. After his close friend Moritz Schlick was murdered, Gödel developed an obsessive fear of being poisoned, and ate only food prepared by his wife, Adele. Following Adele's admission to hospital after suffering a stroke in late 1977, Gödel refused to eat in her absence; he weighed 29 kilograms (65 lb) when he died of "malnutrition and inanition caused by personality disturbance" in Princeton Hospital on January 14, 1978. He was buried in Princeton Cemetery. Adele died in 1981, donating Gödel's papers to the Institute for Advanced Study upon her death.

=== Religious views ===
Gödel believed that God was personal, and called his philosophy "rationalistic, idealistic, optimistic, and theological". He formulated a draft of formal proof of God's existence known as Gödel's ontological proof.

Gödel believed in an afterlife, saying: "Of course this supposes that there are many relationships which today's science and received wisdom haven't any inkling of. But I am convinced of this [the afterlife], independently of any theology." It is "possible today to perceive, by pure reasoning" that it "is entirely consistent with known facts." "If the world is rationally constructed and has meaning, then there must be such a thing [as an afterlife]." He also read widely on other paranormal topics, including telepathy, reincarnation, and ghosts.

In an unmailed answer to a questionnaire, Gödel described his religion as "baptized Lutheran (but not member of any religious congregation). My belief is theistic, not pantheistic, following Leibniz rather than Spinoza." Of religion(s) in general, he said: "Religions are for the most part bad, but not religion itself." According to his wife, Adele, "Gödel, although he did not go to church, was religious and read the Bible in bed every Sunday morning", while of Islam, he said, "I like Islam: it is a consistent [or consequential] idea of religion and open-minded."Although he was born Lutheran, He didn't include trinity in his creed as mentioned in the academic paper by Miloš Dokulil, “May Goedel's Ideas Be Addressed Philosophically?” (2008). The paper explicitly states: “As a ‘Baptized Lutheran’ he did not include ‘Trinity’ in his creed.”

== Legacy ==
Douglas Hofstadter's 1979 book Gödel, Escher, Bach: an Eternal Golden Braid interweaves the work and ideas of Gödel, M. C. Escher, and Johann Sebastian Bach. It partly explores the ramifications of the fact that Gödel's incompleteness theorem can be applied to any Turing-complete computational system, which may include the human brain. In 2005, John W. Dawson Jr. published a biography, Logical Dilemmas: The Life and Work of Kurt Gödel. That year, Rebecca Goldstein published Incompleteness: The Proof and Paradox of Kurt Gödel as part of the Great Discoveries series. Stephen Budiansky's biography Journey to the Edge of Reason: The Life of Kurt Gödel, was a New York Times Critics' Top Book of 2021. Gödel is one of four mathematicians examined in David Malone's 2008 BBC documentary Dangerous Knowledge.

The Kurt Gödel Society, founded in 1987, is an international organization for the promotion of research in logic, philosophy, and the history of mathematics. The University of Vienna hosts the Kurt Gödel Research Center for Mathematical Logic. The Association for Symbolic Logic has held an annual Gödel Lecture since 1990. The Gödel Prize is given annually to an outstanding paper in theoretical computer science. Gödel's philosophical notebooks are being edited at the Kurt Gödel Research Centre at the Berlin-Brandenburg Academy of Sciences and Humanities. Five volumes of Gödel's collected works have been published. The first two include his publications; the third includes unpublished manuscripts from his Nachlass, and the final two include correspondence.

In the 1994 film I.Q., Lou Jacobi portrays Gödel. In the 2023 movie Oppenheimer, Gödel, played by James Urbaniak, briefly appears walking with Einstein in the gardens of Princeton.

== Bibliography ==
=== German ===
- 1930. "Die Vollständigkeit der Axiome des logischen Funktionenkalküls". Monatshefte für Mathematik und Physik. 37: 349–360.
- 1931. "Über formal unentscheidbare Sätze der Principia Mathematica und verwandter Systeme I". Monatshefte für Mathematik und Physik. 38: 173–198.
- 1932. "Zum intuitionistischen Aussagenkalkül". Anzeiger Akademie der Wissenschaften Wien. 69: 65–66.

=== English ===
- 1940. The Consistency of the Continuum Hypothesis. Annals of Mathematics Studies. Vol. 3. Princeton University Press.
- 1947. "What is Cantor's continuum problem?". American Mathematical Monthly. 54 (9): 515–525.
- 1950. "Rotating universes in general relativity theory." Proceedings of the International Congress of Mathematicians (Cambridge, MA). Vol. 1. pp. 175–181.

=== English translation ===
- Kurt Gödel, 1992. On Formally Undecidable Propositions Of Principia Mathematica And Related Systems, tr. B. Meltzer, with a comprehensive introduction by Richard Braithwaite. Dover reprint of the 1962 Basic Books edition.
- Kurt Gödel, 2000. On Formally Undecidable Propositions Of Principia Mathematica And Related Systems, tr. Martin Hirzel
- Jean van Heijenoort, 1967. A Source Book in Mathematical Logic, 1879–1931. Harvard Univ. Press.
  - 1930. "The completeness of the axioms of the functional calculus of logic," 582–91.
  - 1930. "Some metamathematical results on completeness and consistency," 595–96. Abstract to (1931).
  - 1931. "On formally undecidable propositions of Principia Mathematica and related systems," 596–616.
  - 1931a. "On completeness and consistency," 616–17.
- Collected Works: Oxford University Press: New York. Editor-in-chief: Solomon Feferman. Gödel, Kurt. Collected Works. New York: Oxford University Press. — (1986). Feferman, Solomon; Dawson, Jr., John W.; Kleene, Stephen C.; Moore, Gregory H.; Solovay, Robert M.; Van Heijenoort, Jean (eds.). Publications 1929–1936 (PDF). Vol. I. ISBN 978-0-19-503964-1. / Paperback: ISBN 978-0-19-514720-9— (1990). Feferman, Solomon; Dawson, Jr., John W.; Kleene, Stephen C.; Moore, Gregory H.; Solovay, Robert M.; Van Heijenoort, Jean (eds.). Publications 1938–1974 (PDF). Vol. II. Oxford University Press. ISBN 978-0-19-503972-6. / Paperback: ISBN 978-0-19-514721-6— (1995). Feferman, Solomon; Dawson, Jr., John W.; Goldfarb, Warren; Parsons, Charles; Solovay, Robert M. (eds.). Unpublished Essays and Lectures (PDF). Vol. III. ISBN 978-0-19-507255-6. / Paperback: ISBN 978-0-19-514722-3— (2003). Feferman, Solomon; Dawson, Jr., John W.; Goldfarb, Warren; Parsons, Charles; Sieg, Wilfried (eds.). Correspondence A–G (PDF). Vol. IV. Clarendon Press. ISBN 978-0-19-850073-5.— (2003). Feferman, Solomon; Dawson, Jr., John W.; Goldfarb, Warren; Parsons, Charles; Sieg, Wilfried (eds.). Correspondence H–Z (PDF). Vol. V. Clarendon Press. ISBN 978-0-19-850075-9.
- Kurt Gödel, Philosophische Notizbücher / Philosophical Notebooks: De Gruyter: Berlin/München/Boston. Editor: Eva-Maria Engelen.
  - Volume 1 (2019): Philosophie I Maximen 0 / Philosophy I Maxims 0. ISBN 978-3-11-058374-8 / Paperback: ISBN 978-3-11-077683-6.
  - Volume 2 (2020): Zeiteinteilung (Maximen) I und II / Time Management (Maxims) I and II. ISBN 978-3-11-067409-5 / Paperback: ISBN 978-3-11-221621-7.
  - Volume 3 (2021): Maximen III / Maxims III. ISBN 978-3-11-075325-7 / Paperback: ISBN 978-3-11-221622-4.
  - Volume 4 (2023): Maximen IV / Maxims IV. ISBN 978-3-11-077294-4 / Paperback: ISBN 978-3-11-162253-8.
  - Volume 5 (2024): Maximen V / Maxims V. ISBN 978-3-11-108114-4 / Paperback: ISBN 978-3-11-221623-1.
  - Volume 6 (2025): Maximen VI / Maxims VI. ISBN 978-3-11-139031-4.
  - Volume 7 (2026): Maximen VII / Maxims VII. ISBN 978-3-11-140466-0.

== See also ==
- Gödel fuzzy logic
- Gödel machine
- Gödel Prize
- Gödel t-norm
- Gödel's ontological proof
- Gödel's Dialectica interpretation
- Infinite-valued logic
- List of Austrian scientists
- List of pioneers in computer science
- Mathematical Platonism
- Original proof of Gödel's completeness theorem
- Primitive recursive functional
- Gödel–Löb logic
- Strange loop
- Tarski's undefinability theorem
- World Logic Day
- Gödel's Loophole

== Sources ==
- Dawson, John W (1997), Logical dilemmas: The life and work of Kurt Gödel, Wellesley, MA: AK Peters.
- Goldstein, Rebecca (2005), Incompleteness: The Proof and Paradox of Kurt Gödel, New York: W.W. Norton & Co, ISBN 978-0-393-32760-1.
- Wang, Hao (1987), Reflections on Kurt Gödel, Cambridge: MIT Press, ISBN 0-262-73087-1
- Wang, Hao (1996), A Logical Journey: From Gödel to Philosophy, Cambridge: MIT Press, ISBN 0-262-23189-1
