= Abelian and Tauberian theorems =

Used in the summation of divergent series

In mathematics, Abelian and Tauberian theorems are theorems giving conditions for two methods of summing divergent series to give the same result, named after Niels Henrik Abel and Alfred Tauber. The original examples are Abel's theorem showing that if a series converges to some limit then its Abel sum is the same limit, and Tauber's theorem showing that if the Abel sum of a series exists and the coefficients are sufficiently small (o(1/n)) then the series converges to the Abel sum. More general Abelian and Tauberian theorems give similar results for more general summation methods.

There is not yet a clear distinction between Abelian and Tauberian theorems, and no generally accepted definition of what these terms mean. Often, a theorem is called "Abelian" if it shows that some summation method gives the usual sum for convergent series, and is called "Tauberian" if it gives conditions for a series summable by some method that allows it to be summable in the usual sense.

In the theory of integral transforms, Abelian theorems give the asymptotic behaviour of the transform based on properties of the original function. Conversely, Tauberian theorems give the asymptotic behaviour of the original function based on properties of the transform but usually require some restrictions on the original function.

== Abelian theorems ==
For any summation method L, its Abelian theorem is the result that if c = (c_{n}) is a convergent sequence, with limit C, then L(c) = C.

An example is given by the Cesàro method, in which L is defined as the limit of the arithmetic means of the first N terms of c, as N tends to infinity. One can prove that if c does converge to C, then so does the sequence (d_{N}) where

$$d_N = \frac{c_1+c_2+\cdots+c_N} N.$$

To see that, subtract C everywhere to reduce to the case C = 0. Then divide the sequence into an initial segment, and a tail of small terms: given any ε > 0 we can take N large enough to make the initial segment of terms up to c_{N} average to at most ε/2, while each term in the tail is bounded by ε/2 so that the average is also necessarily bounded.

The name derives from Abel's theorem on power series. In that case L is the radial limit (thought of within the complex unit disk), where we let r tend to the limit 1 from below along the real axis in the power series with term

a_{n}z^{n}

and set z = r ·e^{iθ}. That theorem has its main interest in the case that the power series has radius of convergence exactly 1: if the radius of convergence is greater than one, the convergence of the power series is uniform for r in [0,1] so that the sum is automatically continuous and it follows directly that the limit as r tends up to 1 is simply the sum of the a_{n}. When the radius is 1 the power series will have some singularity on |z| = 1; the assertion is that, nonetheless, if the sum of the a_{n} exists, it is equal to the limit over r. This therefore fits exactly into the abstract picture.

== Tauberian theorems ==
Partial converses to Abelian theorems are called Tauberian theorems. The original result of Alfred Tauber (1897) stated that if we assume also

a_{n} = o(1/n)

(see Little o notation) and the radial limit exists, then the series obtained by setting z = 1 is actually convergent. This was strengthened by John Edensor Littlewood: we need only assume O(1/n). A sweeping generalization is the Hardy–Littlewood Tauberian theorem.

In the abstract setting, therefore, an Abelian theorem states that the domain of L contains the convergent sequences, and its values there are equal to those of the Lim functional. A Tauberian theorem states, under some growth condition, that the domain of L is exactly the convergent sequences and no more.

If one thinks of L as some generalised type of weighted average, taken to the limit, a Tauberian theorem allows one to discard the weighting, under the correct hypotheses. There are many applications of this kind of result in number theory, in particular in handling Dirichlet series.

The development of the field of Tauberian theorems received a fresh turn with Norbert Wiener's very general results, namely Wiener's Tauberian theorem and its large collection of corollaries. The central theorem can now be proved by Banach algebra methods, and contains much, though not all, of the previous theory.

== See also ==
- Wiener's Tauberian theorem
- Hardy–Littlewood Tauberian theorem
- Haar's Tauberian theorem
