= Eduard Weyr =

Czech mathematician

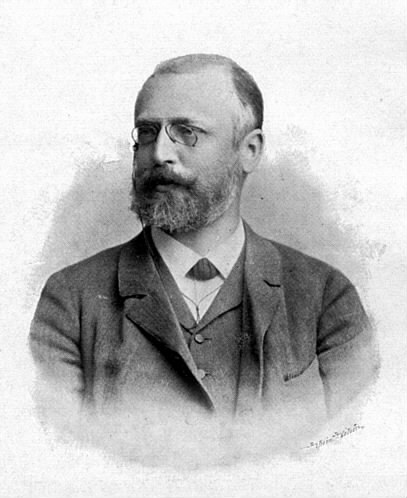
Eduard Weyr

Eduard Weyr (22 June 1852 – 23 July 1903) was a Czech mathematician. Today he is chiefly remembered as the discoverer of a certain canonical form for square matrices over algebraically closed fields. Weyr presented this form briefly in a paper published in 1885. He followed it up with a more elaborate treatment in a paper published in 1890. This particular canonical form has been named as the Weyr canonical form in a paper by Shapiro published in The American Mathematical Monthly in 1999. Previously, this form has been variously called as modified Jordan form, reordered Jordan form, second Jordan form, and H-form.

== Life ==
Weyr was born in Prague, Bohemia, Austria-Hungary on 22 June 1852. His father was a mathematician at a secondary school in Prague, and his older brother, Emil Weyr, was also a mathematician. Weyr studied at Prague Polytechnic and Charles-Ferdinand University in Prague. He received his doctorate from the University of Göttingen in 1873 with dissertation Über algebraische Raumcurven. After a short spell in Paris studying under Charles Hermite and Joseph Alfred Serret, he returned to Prague where he eventually became a professor at Charles-Ferdinand University. Weyr also published research in geometry, in particular projective and differential geometry. In 1893 in Chicago, his paper Sur l'équation des lignes géodésiques was read (but not by him) at the International Congress of Mathematicians held in connection with the World's Columbian Exposition.

He died in Záboří nad Labem on 23 July 1903.

== Weyr canonical form ==
The image shows an example of a general Weyr matrix consisting of two blocks each of which is a basic Weyr matrix. The basic Weyr matrix in the top-left corner has the structure (4,2,1) and the other one has the structure (2,2,1,1).

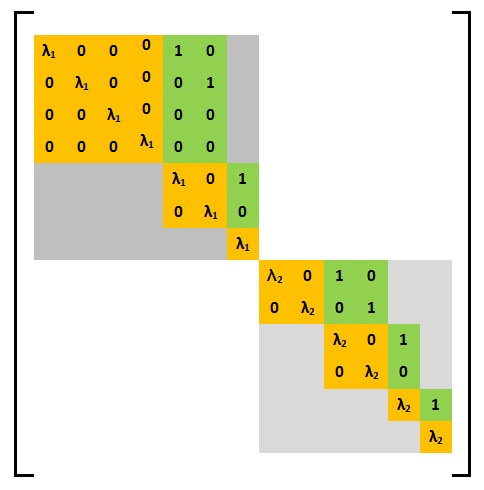
