= Marcel Grossmann =

Swiss-Hungarian mathematician (1878–1936)

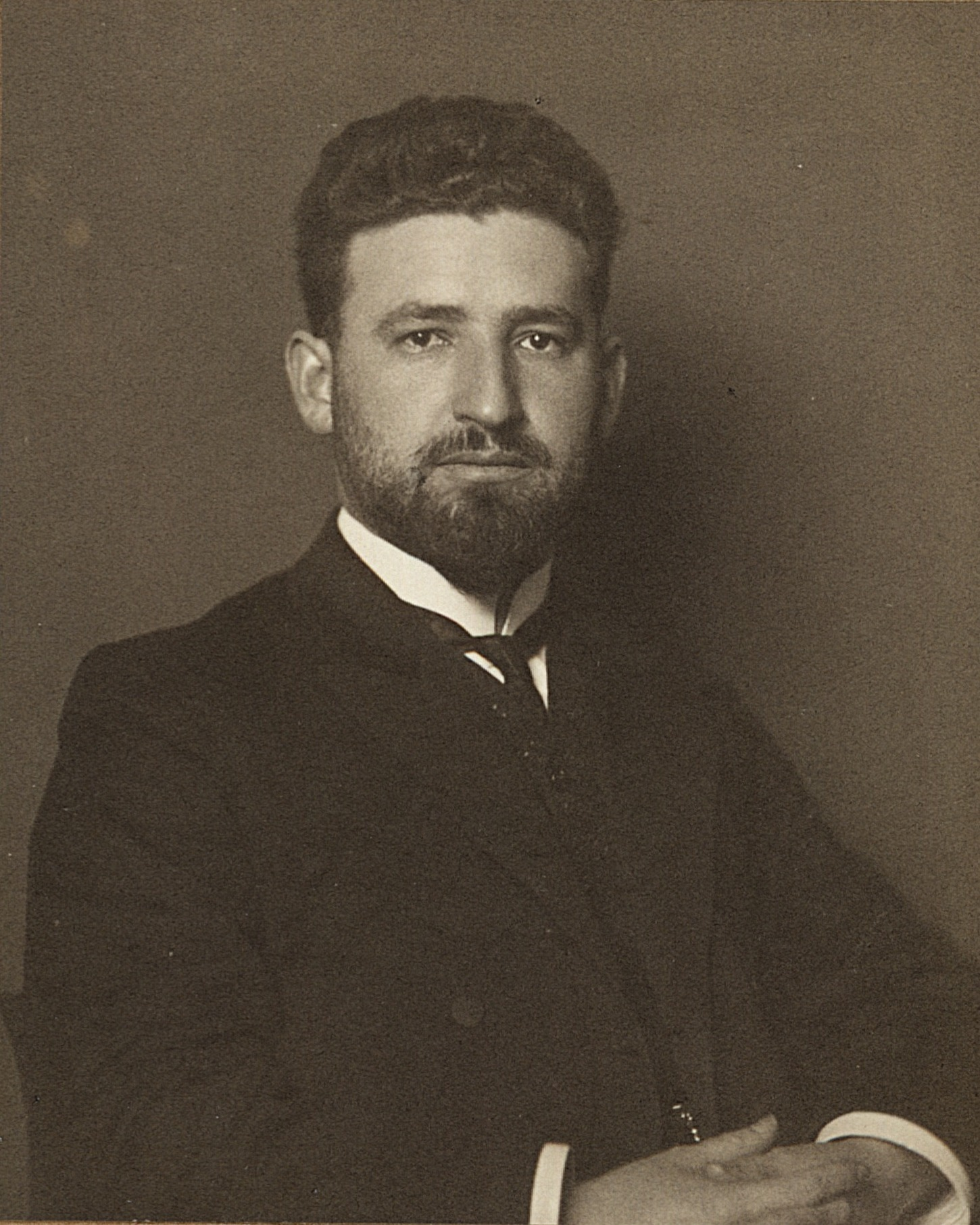
- Born: Grossmann Marcell; April 9, 1878; Budapest, Austria-Hungary
- Died: September 7, 1936 (aged 58); Zürich, Switzerland
- Education: Federal Polytechnic School
- Awards: Honorary member (1935) of the Swiss Mathematical Society
- Scientific career
- Fields: Mathematics
- Doctoral advisor: Wilhelm Fiedler

Marcel Grossmann (Hungarian: Grossmann Marcell; April 9, 1878 – September 7, 1936) was a Swiss mathematician who was a friend and classmate of Albert Einstein. Grossmann came from an old Swiss family in Zürich. His father managed a textile factory. He became a Professor of Mathematics at the Federal Polytechnic School in Zürich, today the ETH Zurich, specializing in descriptive geometry.

Grossmann was born to a Jewish family in Budapest.

== Career ==
In 1900 Grossmann graduated from the Federal Polytechnic School (ETH) and became an assistant to the geometer Wilhelm Fiedler. He continued to do research on non-Euclidean geometry and taught in high schools for the next seven years. In 1902, he earned his doctorate from the University of Zurich with the thesis Ueber die metrischen Eigenschaften kollinearer Gebilde (translated On the Metrical Properties of Collinear Structures) with Fiedler as advisor. In 1907, he was appointed full professor of descriptive geometry at the Federal Polytechnic School.

As a professor of geometry, Grossmann organized summer courses for high school teachers. In 1910, he became one of the founders of the Swiss Mathematical Society. He was an Invited Speaker of the ICM in 1912 at Cambridge and in 1920 at Strasbourg.

=== Collaborations with Albert Einstein ===
Albert Einstein's friendship with Grossmann began with their school days in Zürich. Grossmann's careful and complete lecture notes at the Federal Polytechnic School proved to be a salvation for Einstein, who missed many lectures. Grossmann's father helped Einstein get his job at the Swiss Patent Office in Bern, and it was Grossmann who helped to conduct the negotiations to bring Einstein back from Prague as a professor of physics at the Zurich Polytechnic. Grossmann was an expert in differential geometry and tensor calculus, the mathematical tools which would provide a proper mathematical framework for Einstein's work on gravity. Thus, it was natural that Einstein would enter into a scientific collaboration with Grossmann.

It was Grossmann who emphasized the importance of a non-Euclidean geometry called Riemannian geometry (also elliptic geometry) to Einstein, which was a necessary step in the development of Einstein's general theory of relativity. Abraham Pais's book on Einstein suggests that Grossmann mentored Einstein in tensor theory as well. Grossmann introduced Einstein to the absolute differential calculus, started by Elwin Bruno Christoffel and fully developed by Gregorio Ricci-Curbastro and Tullio Levi-Civita. Grossmann facilitated Einstein's unique synthesis of mathematical and theoretical physics in what is still today considered the most elegant and powerful theory of gravity: the general theory of relativity. The collaboration of Einstein and Grossmann led to a ground-breaking paper, "Outline of a Generalized Theory of Relativity and of a Theory of Gravitation", which was published in 1913 and was one of the two fundamental papers which established Einstein's theory of gravity.

== Death ==
Grossmann died of multiple sclerosis in 1936. The community of relativists celebrates Grossmann's contributions to physics by organizing Marcel Grossmann meetings every three years.

== Legacy ==
The International Center for Relativistic Astrophysics presents the Marcel Grossmann Awards. Each recipient receives a silver casting of the T. E. S. T. sculpture by the artist A. Pierelli. Each year, an institution is selected and between two and six individual scientists are selected. Past institutional winners include the Planck Scientific Collaboration (ESA), AlbaNova University Center, Institut des Hautes Etudes Scientifique (IHES) and others. Past individual winners include Shing-Tung Yau, Tsung-Dao Lee, Christine Jones Forman and Stephen Hawking.

== See also ==
- History of general relativity
- Timeline of gravitational physics and relativity
