= Emil Weyr =

Austrian-Czech mathematician

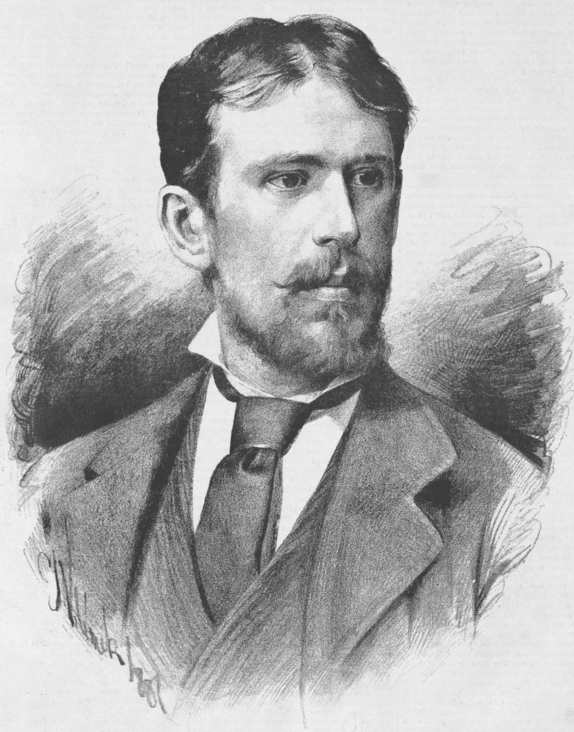
- Born: 31 August 1848/1 September 1848; Prague, Bohemia
- Died: 25 January 1894 (aged 45); Vienna, Austria-Hungary
- Education: University of Prague, Ph.D. 1870; Universität Leipzig, Dr. phil. 1869
- Scientific career
- Fields: Mathematics
- Workplaces: University of Vienna
- Thesis: Vier gedruckte Abhandlungen aus den Sitzungsberichten der Wiener Akademie
- Doctoral advisor: Otto Wilhelm Fiedler; Carl Gottfried Neumann; Wilhelm Scheibner
- Doctoral students: Alfred Tauber; Wilhelm Wirtinger

Emil Weyr (31 August / 1 September 1848 – 25 January 1894) was an Austrian-Czech mathematician, known for his numerous publications on geometry.

Born in Prague, Weyr attended the Prague Polytechnic, where he was taught by Heinrich Durège and Otto Wilhelm Fiedler.

== Biography ==
=== Early life ===
The birthdate of Weyr is disputed. Parish records indicate that Emil was born in Prague, on 1 September 1848, whereas his family believed he was born on 31 August 1848 and celebrated his birthday on this date. His parents were František Weyr and Marie Rumplova. František was a mathematics professor at a secondary school Emil would later attend. Emil's parents had ten children, five sons and five daughters. One of his brothers Eduard Weyr, was also a mathematician.

=== Early Education ===
Emil attended Our Lady of the Snows primary school in 1854. Following this he would study at the German secondary school on Mikulandská street in Prague from 1859. By this age Emil was already fascinated by maths through his father. In 1865 he would start attending the Prague Polytechnic, where he would study for three years. He was taught by O.W.Fiedler.

Weyr was assistant to the mathematics chair Professor H.Durège in 1868. The following year Emil earned his Doctorate in Philosophy at Leipzig University. Ernst Mach suggested to Emil that he should make a request for Habilitation at the Prague University. On 3 May 1870 he was given the senior role in the geometry faculty of the Prague Polytechnic. Here he would attain his Ph.D. and publish over 30 papers over the period from 1869 to 1870.

=== Trip to Italy ===
Emil had planned to travel to Paris to undertake a study break during the autumn of 1870, but due to the German-French War the destination for this venture changed to Milan. On 7 November he travelled by train to Trieste, then Venice where he stayed for ten days before arriving in Milan on 17 November. In February he would attend lectures given by Luigi Cremona and Felice Casorati. Later this year he got the chance to put his studies on hold to travel around Italy and visit the different universities and meet fellow colleagues, some of whom he would stay in touch with.

His relationship with Luigi Cremona emphasises how significant this trip was for Weyr, highlighted by their constant letters to each other in the twenty-one-year period following their first meeting. Emil originally wrote letters to Cremona as one would talk to a mentor, in a position of less prestige. But as the years went on the communication between the two became academic in tone. In the following years he would publish numerous papers in Italian (with help from his Italian colleagues) which would further highlights the impact of this trip to Italy.

=== Life in Education ===
On 6 February 1870 Weyr was inducted into the Union of Czech Mathematicians, which he would be given the chairman role of on 7 July 1872. In this role he created a library of scientific resources and would participate in events centred on publishing.

Emil was made the adjunct professor of maths at the Prague Polytechnic in 1871, where he would begin to lecture at the university. He also published the textbook 'Foundations of Higher Geometry' in 1871 with his brother Edmund. Weyr would also translate some of Cremona's publications. He would again travel to Italy in April 1873 to discuss some of these with Cremona.

He was made a full professor at the University of Vienna on 26 September 1875. Weyr would rarely publish in Czech after he left for Austria.

In the late 1870s and throughout the 80s Emil would publish many different books on geometry. He would lead the geometry school in Vienna for the entire duration of his stay.

Weyr married Marie Waniek in Vienna 1877. They had three children together: František, Jindřich and Marie. František went on to be a lawyer.

In 1890 Weyr and Gustav Ritter von Escherich created the mathematical journal Monatshefte für Mathematik und Physik, the first few editions of which would include his brother Eduard's work.

Weyr died on 25 January 1894 and was buried in a family grave in Olšany in Prague on 30 January.

== Selected publications ==
- Theorie der mehrdeutigen geometrischen Elementargebilde und der algebraischen Curven und Flächen als deren Erzeugnisse. Leipzig: B. G. Teubner. 1869.
- Geometrie der räumlichen Erzeugnisse ein-zwei-deutiger Gebilde. Leipzig: B. G. Teubner. 1870.
- Die Elemente der projectivischen Geometrie. Wien: Wilhelm Braumüller. 1883.
- Über die Geometrie der alten Ægypter. Wien: K. Gerold's Sohn. 1884.

== See also ==
- Eduard Weyr, brother of Emil Weyr
