= Gustav von Escherich =

Austrian mathematician

Gustav Ritter von Escherich
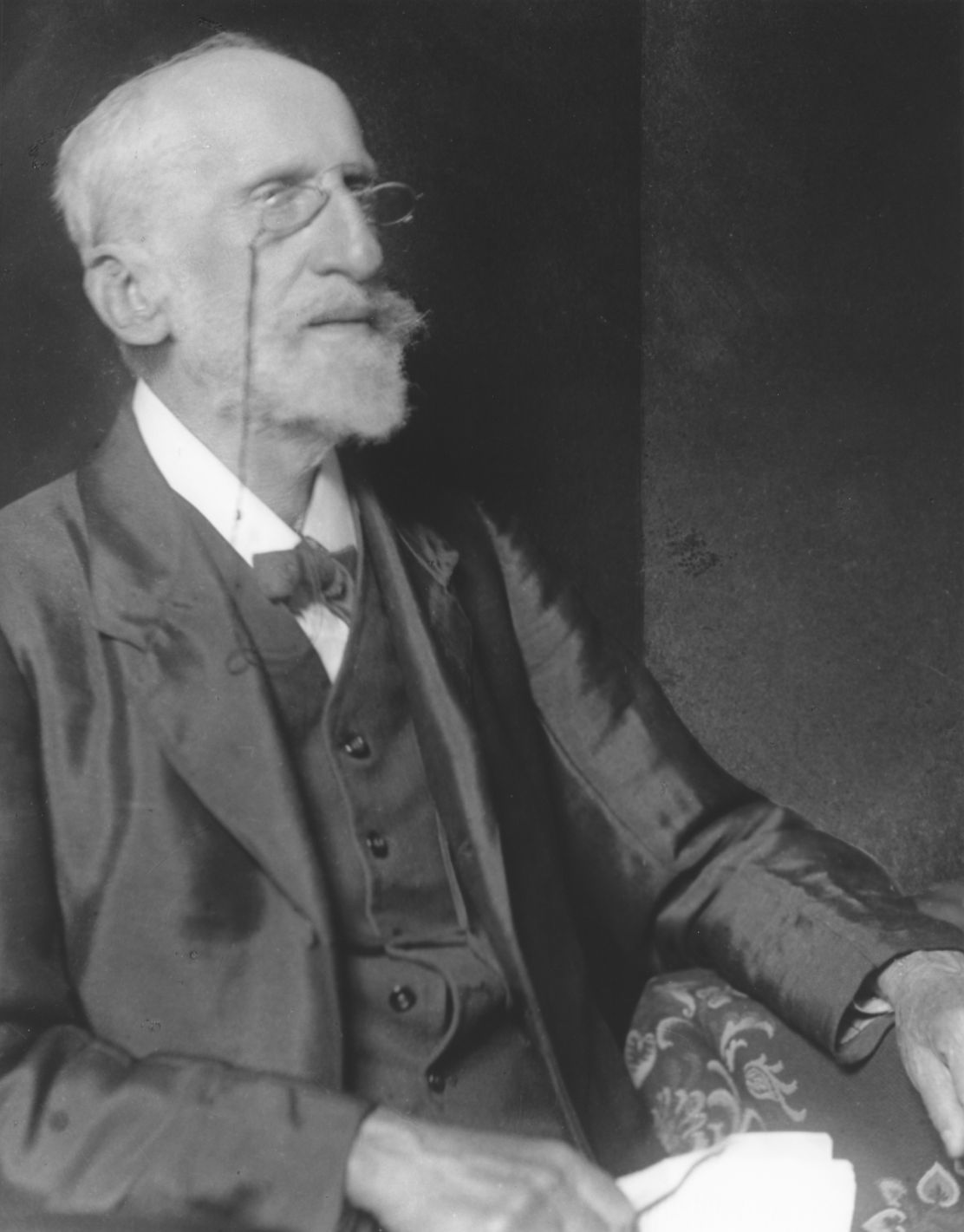
- Born: 1 June 1849; Mantua, Austrian Empire
- Died: 28 January 1935 (aged 85); Vienna, Federal State of Austria
- Citizenship: Austrian
- Education: University of Vienna (PhD, 1873)
- Known for: Monatshefte für Mathematik und Physik; Austrian Mathematical Society
- Scientific career
- Fields: Mathematics
- Workplaces: University of Vienna; University of Graz; Graz University of Technology
- Thesis: Die Geometrie auf Flächen constanter negativer Krümmung (1873)
- Doctoral advisor: Johannes Frischauf; Karl Friesach
- Doctoral students: Johann Radon

Gustav Ritter von Escherich (1 June 1849 – 28 January 1935) was an Austrian mathematician.

== Biography ==
Born in Mantua, he studied mathematics and physics at the University of Vienna. From 1876 to 1879 he was professor at the University of Graz. In 1882 he went to the Graz University of Technology and in 1884 he went to the University of Vienna, where he also was president of the university in 1903/04.

Together with Emil Weyr he founded the journal Monatshefte für Mathematik und Physik and together with Ludwig Boltzmann and Emil Müller he founded the Austrian Mathematical Society.

Escherich died in Vienna.

== Work on hyperbolic geometry ==
Following Eugenio Beltrami's (1868) discussion of hyperbolic geometry, Escherich in 1874 published a paper named "The geometry on surfaces of constant negative curvature". He used coordinates initially introduced by Christoph Gudermann (1830) for spherical geometry, which were adapted by Escherich using hyperbolic functions. For the case of translation of points on this surface of negative curvature, Escherich gave the following transformation on page 510:

$x=\frac{\sinh\frac{a}{k}+x'\cosh\frac{a}{k}}{\cosh\frac{a}{k}+x'\sinh\frac{a}{k}}$ and $y=\frac{y'}{\cosh\frac{a}{k}+x'\sinh\frac{a}{k}}$

which is identical with the relativistic velocity addition formula by interpreting the coordinates as velocities and by using the rapidity:

$$\frac{\sinh\frac{a}{k}}{\cosh\frac{a}{k} }=\tanh\frac{a}{k}=\frac{v}{c}$$

or with a Lorentz boost by using homogeneous coordinates:

$$(x,\ y,\ x',\ y')=\left(\frac{x_{1}}{x_{0}},\ \frac{x_{2}}{x_{0}},\ \frac{x_{1}^{\prime}}{x_{0}^{\prime}},\ \frac{x_{2}^{\prime}}{x_{0}^{\prime}}\right)$$

These are in fact the relations between the coordinates of Gudermann/Escherich in terms of the Beltrami–Klein model and the Weierstrass coordinates of the hyperboloid model - this relation was pointed out by Homersham Cox (1882, p. 186).
