= Hardy–Littlewood Tauberian theorem =

Tauberian theorem

In mathematical analysis, the Hardy–Littlewood Tauberian theorem is a Tauberian theorem relating the asymptotics of the partial sums of a series with the asymptotics of its Abel summation. In this form, the theorem asserts that if the sequence $a_n\geq 0$ is such that there is an asymptotic equivalence

$$\sum_{n=0}^\infty a_n e^{-ny} \sim \frac{1}{y}\ \text{as}\ y\downarrow 0$$

then there is also an asymptotic equivalence

$$\sum_{k=0}^n a_k \sim n$$

as $n\to\infty$. The integral formulation of the theorem relates in an analogous manner the asymptotics of the cumulative distribution function of a function with the asymptotics of its Laplace transform.

The theorem was proved in 1914 by G. H. Hardy and J. E. Littlewood. In 1930, Jovan Karamata gave a new and much simpler proof.

== Statement of the theorem ==
=== Series formulation ===
This formulation is from Titchmarsh. Suppose $a_n\geq 0$ for all $n\in\mathbb{N}$, and we have

$$\sum_{n=0}^\infty a_n x^n \sim \frac{1}{1-x}\ \text{as}\ x\uparrow 1 .$$

Then as $n\to\infty$ we have

$$\sum_{k=0}^n a_k \sim n.$$

The theorem is sometimes quoted in equivalent forms, where instead of requiring $a_n\geq 0$, we require $a_n=O(1)$, or we require $a_n\geq -K$ for some constant $K$. The theorem is sometimes quoted in another equivalent formulation (through the change of variable $x=1/e^y$). If,

$$\sum_{n=0}^\infty a_n e^{-ny} \sim \frac{1}{y}\ \text{as}\ y\downarrow 0$$

then

$$\sum_{k=0}^n a_k \sim n.$$

=== Integral formulation ===
The following more general formulation is from Feller. Consider a real-valued function $F:[0,\infty)\to\mathbb{R}$ of bounded variation. The Laplace–Stieltjes transform of $F$ is defined by the Stieltjes integral

$$\omega(s) = \int_0^\infty e^{-st}\,dF(t).$$

The theorem relates the asymptotics of ω with those of $F$ in the following way. If $\rho$ is a non-negative real number, then the following statements are equivalent

- $\omega(s)\sim C s^{-\rho},\quad\rm{as\ }s\to 0$
- $F(t)\sim \frac{C}{\Gamma(\rho+1)}t^\rho, \ \text{as}\ t\to\infty.$

Here $\Gamma$ denotes the Gamma function. One obtains the theorem for series as a special case by taking $\rho=1$ and $F(t)$ to be a piecewise constant function with value $\textstyle{\sum_{k=0}^n a_k}$ between $t=n$ and $t=n+1$.

A slight improvement is possible. According to the definition of a slowly varying function, $L(x)$ is slow varying at infinity iff

$$\frac{L(tx)}{L(x)}\to 1,\quad x\to\infty$$

for every $t>0$. Let $L$ be a function slowly varying at infinity and $\rho\geq 0$. Then the following statements are equivalent

- $\omega(s)\sim s^{-\rho}L(s^{-1}),\quad\text{as}\ s\to 0$
- $F(t)\sim \frac{1}{\Gamma(\rho+1)}t^\rho L(t), \quad\text{as}\ t\to\infty.$

== Karamata's proof ==
Karamata (1930) found a short proof of the theorem by considering the functions $g$ such that

$$\lim_{x\to 1} (1-x)\sum a_nx^ng(x^n) = \int_0^1 g(t)dt$$

An easy calculation shows that all monomials $g(x)=x^k$ have this property, and therefore so do all polynomials $g$. This can be extended to a function $g$ with simple (step) discontinuities by approximating it by polynomials from above and below (using the Weierstrass approximation theorem and a little extra fudging) and using the fact that the coefficients $a_n$ are positive. In particular the function given by $g(t)=1/t$ if $1/e<t<1$ and $0$ otherwise has this property. But then for $x=e^{-1/N}$ the sum $\sum a_n x^n g(x^n)$ is $a_0 + \cdots + a_N$ and the integral of $g$ is $1$, from which the Hardy–Littlewood theorem follows immediately.

== Examples ==
=== Non-positive coefficients ===
The theorem can fail without the condition that the coefficients are non-negative. For example, the function

$$\frac{1}{(1+x)^2(1-x)} = 1-x+2x^2-2x^3+3x^4-3x^5+\cdots$$

is asymptotic to $1/4(1-x)$ as $x\to 1$, but the partial sums of its coefficients are 1, 0, 2, 0, 3, 0, 4, ... and are not asymptotic to any linear function.

=== Littlewood's extension of Tauber's theorem ===
In 1911 Littlewood proved an extension of Tauber's converse of Abel's theorem. Littlewood showed the following: If $a_n=O(1/n)$, and we have

$$\sum a_n x^n \to s \ \text{as}\ x\uparrow 1$$

then

$$\sum a_n = s.$$

This came historically before the Hardy–Littlewood Tauberian theorem, but can be proved as a simple application of it.

=== Prime number theorem ===
In 1915 Hardy and Littlewood developed a proof of the prime number theorem based on their Tauberian theorem; they proved

$$\sum_{n=2}^\infty \Lambda(n) e^{-ny} \sim \frac{1}{y},$$

where $\Lambda$ is the von Mangoldt function, and then conclude

$$\sum_{n \le x} \Lambda(n) \sim x,$$

an equivalent form of the prime number theorem. Littlewood developed a simpler proof, still based on this Tauberian theorem, in 1971.

== Notes ==
- Karamata, J. (December 1930). "Über die Hardy-Littlewoodschen Umkehrungen des Abelschen Stetigkeitssatzes". Mathematische Zeitschrift (in German). 32 (1): 319–320. doi:10.1007/BF01194636.
