= Monatshefte für Mathematik =

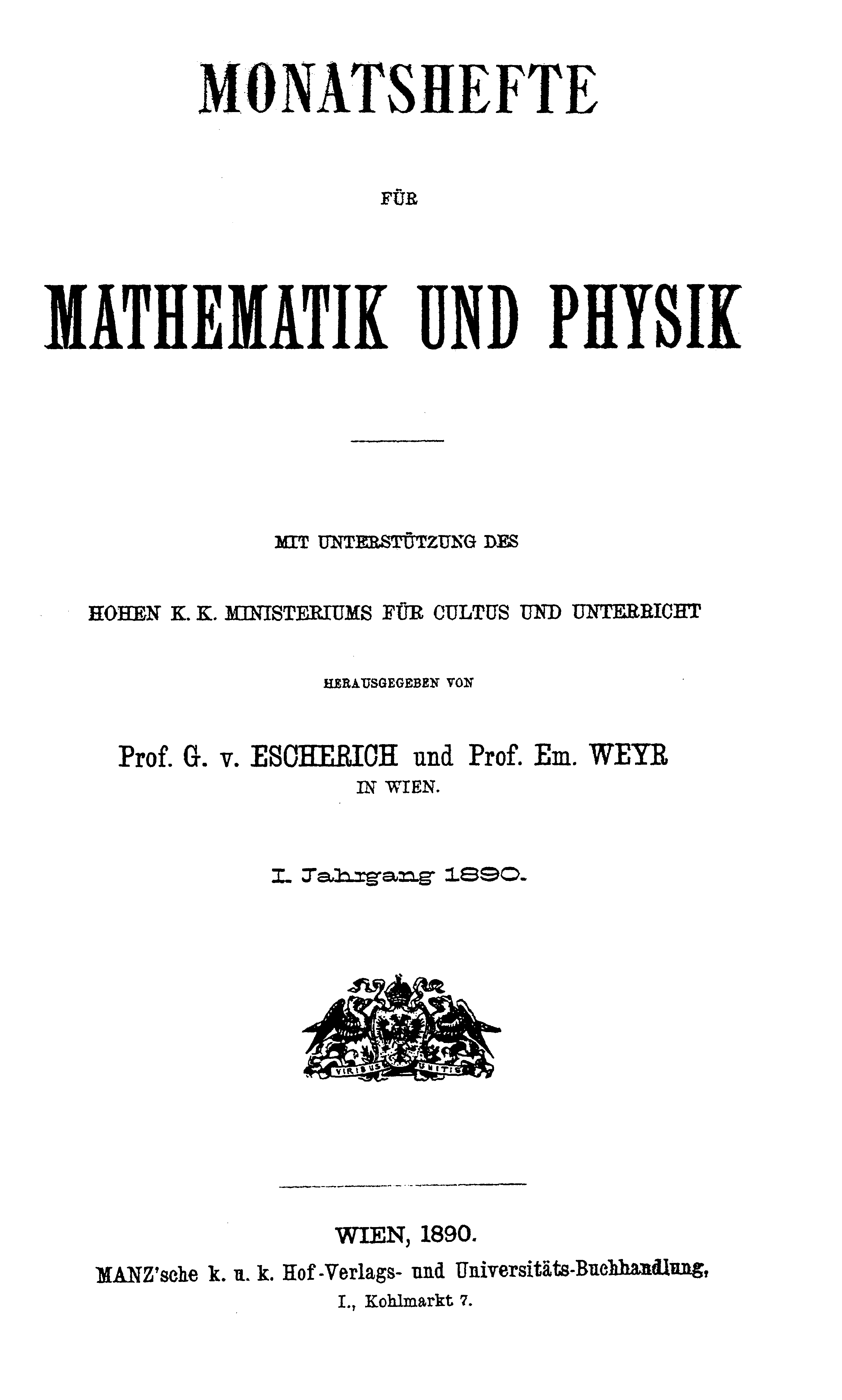
- Discipline: Mathematics
- Language: English
- Edited by: Adrian Constantin

Publication details
- Former name(s): Monatshefte für Mathematik und Physik
- History: 1890–present
- Publisher: Springer
- Frequency: Monthly
- Impact factor: 0.764 (2009)

Standard abbreviations
- ISO 4: Monatsh. Math.

Indexing
- CODEN: MNMTA2
- ISSN: 0026-9255 (print); 1436-5081 (web)
- LCCN: 51026443
- OCLC no.: 01589453

Links
- Journal homepage

Monatshefte für Mathematik is a peer-reviewed mathematics journal established in 1890. Among its well-known papers is "Über formal unentscheidbare Sätze der Principia Mathematica und verwandter Systeme I" by Kurt Gödel, published in 1931.

The journal was founded by Gustav von Escherich and Emil Weyr in 1890 as Monatshefte für Mathematik und Physik and published until 1941. In 1947 it was reestablished by Johann Radon under its current title. It is currently published by Springer in cooperation with the Austrian Mathematical Society. The journal is indexed by Mathematical Reviews and Zentralblatt MATH. Its 2009 MCQ was 0.58, and its 2009 impact factor was 0.764.
