= John W. Dawson Jr. =

American mathematician

John William Dawson, Jr.
- Born: February 4, 1944 (age 82); Wichita, Kansas, U.S.

Academic background
- Education: Massachusetts Institute of Technology (BS); University of Michigan (PhD)

Academic work
- Discipline: Mathematics
- Sub-discipline: Mathematical logic Set theory History of logic
- Institutions: Princeton University; Penn State York

John William Dawson, Jr. (born February 4, 1944) is an American academic who is an emeritus professor of mathematics at Penn State York.

== Early life and education ==
Born in Wichita, Kansas, Dawson attended the Massachusetts Institute of Technology as a National Merit Scholar before earning a doctorate in mathematical logic from the University of Michigan in 1972.

== Career ==
An internationally recognized authority on the life and work of Kurt Gödel, Dawson is the author of numerous articles on axiomatic set theory and the history of modern logic. From 1982 to 1984, he catalogued Gödel's papers at the Institute for Advanced Study. He also served as a co-editor of Gödel's Collected Works. He retired as co-editor-in-chief of the journal History and Philosophy of Logic.

== Books by Dawson ==
- John W. Dawson Jr, 1997. Logical Dilemmas: The Life and Work of Kurt Gödel, A. K. Peters, Wellesley, MA, ISBN 1-56881-256-6
- John W. Dawson Jr, 2015. Why Prove it Again? Alternative Proofs in Mathematical Practice, Springer, Chaim, ISBN 978-3-319-17367-2

== Additional publications ==
- Dawson, John W. Jr. The published work of Kurt Gödel: an annotated bibliography. Notre Dame J. Formal Logic 24 (1983), no. 2, 255–284.
