= Right half-plane =

In complex analysis, the (open) right half-plane is the set of all points in the complex plane whose real part is strictly positive, that is, the set $\{z \in \Complex\, :\, \mbox{Re}(z) > 0\}$.

An illustration of the right-half plane.
