= Gödel's loophole =

Alleged flaw in the United States Constitution

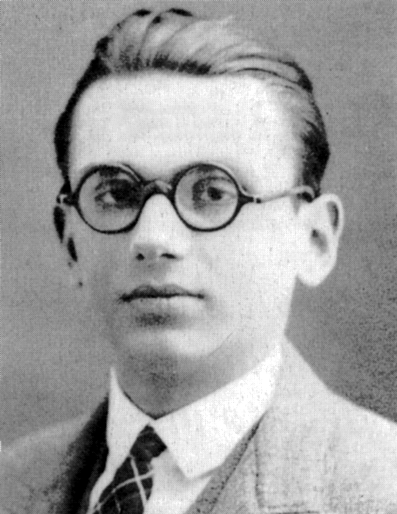
Kurt Gödel in 1925

Gödel's loophole is a supposed "inner contradiction" in the Constitution of the United States postulated in 1947 by the Austrian-American logician, mathematician, and analytic philosopher Kurt Gödel. It would permit the republican structure of the United States to be legally turned into a dictatorship. Gödel told his friend Oskar Morgenstern about the flaw and Morgenstern told Albert Einstein, but Morgenstern, in his recollection of the incident in 1971, never reported the exact problem. This has led to speculation about what is now called "Gödel's loophole". John Nowak, a scholar of US constitutional law, has called it "one of the great unsolved problems of constitutional law".

== History ==
When Gödel was studying to take his US citizenship test in 1947, he came across what he called an "inner contradiction" in the U.S. Constitution. At the time, he was at the Institute for Advanced Study in Princeton, New Jersey, where he was good friends with Albert Einstein and Oskar Morgenstern. Gödel told Morgenstern about the flaw in the constitution, which, he said, would allow the U.S. to legally become a fascist state. Morgenstern tried to convince Gödel that this was very unlikely, but Gödel remained very concerned about it. He was an Austrian by birth and, having lived through the 1933 coup d'état and escaped from Nazi Germany after the Anschluss, was concerned about living in a fascist dictatorship. Morgenstern had secret discussions with Gödel about his concerns and told Einstein about them.

On the day of the examination some months later, Morgenstern and Einstein, who were to be his witnesses, drove Gödel to the courthouse in Trenton, New Jersey. Both had already taken the test and become naturalized U.S. citizens. At one point during the drive, Einstein, in the front seat, turned to Gödel in the back and—knowing of Gödel's concerns—asked, "Now, Gödel, are you really well prepared for this examination?" According to Morgenstern, Einstein's purpose in asking this was to rattle Gödel, whose reaction amused him.

At the courthouse, witnesses normally remained outside of the room during citizenship examinations, but because Einstein, a celebrity, was involved, and because the judge, Phillip Forman, had administered the oath of citizenship to Einstein, all three men were invited in. During the examination, Forman asked Gödel what the government of Austria was, to which he replied: "It was a republic, but the constitution was such that it finally was changed into a dictatorship." The judge commented that this could not happen in the U.S., and Gödel responded, "Oh, yes, I can prove it"; but the judge did not pursue the matter further.

== Nature of the loophole ==
Since the exact nature of Gödel's loophole has never been published, what it is, precisely, is not known. In his 1990 book Paradox of Self-Amendment, Peter Suber speculates that Gödel noticed that Article V, which describes the process by which the Constitution can be amended, contains only procedural limitations, not substantive limitations. Hence, if citizens follow the right procedures, they can adopt any new provisions.

In his 2012 paper "Gödel's Loophole", F. E. Guerra-Pujol speculates that the loophole is that Article V's procedures can be applied to Article V itself. It can therefore be altered in a "downward" direction, making it easier to alter the article again in the future. So even if, as is now the case, amending the Constitution is difficult, once Article V is amended downward, the next attempts to do so could be easier.

== Aftermath and reception ==
Morgenstern's notes on the incident were published in 2019, and there are no earlier accounts of his recollections. Morgenstern is verifiably incorrect in some details, such as the year of Gödel's citizenship test, which was 1947, not 1946. Many versions of the story were published before the release of Morgenstern's notes, and they vary in their details. For instance, in the mathematician and science fiction author Rudy Rucker's telling of the story in his 2008 novel Mathematicians in Love, Gödel runs to Einstein with the news and Einstein calms Gödel down.

The story is reported in books on Gödel and his circle and on constitutional law.
