= Kantonsschule Rämibühl =

Coordinates: 47°22′19″N 8°33′08″E

Location
- Rämistrasse 56/58, 8001 Zürich; Zurich; Switzerland

Information
- Type: Public coeducational
- Established: 1832; 194 years ago
- Grades: Langzeit- and Kurzzeitmittelschule (7-12, 9-12)
- Enrollment: >2000
- Campus: Urban
- composed of: Literargymnasium (Langgymnasium); Realgymnasium (Lang-); Mathematisch-Naturwissenschaftliches Gymnasium (Kurz-); Kunst -& Sport-Gymnasium (Kurz-)
- Website: http://www.rgzh.ch http://www.lgr.ch http://www.mng.ch http://www.ksgymnasium.ch
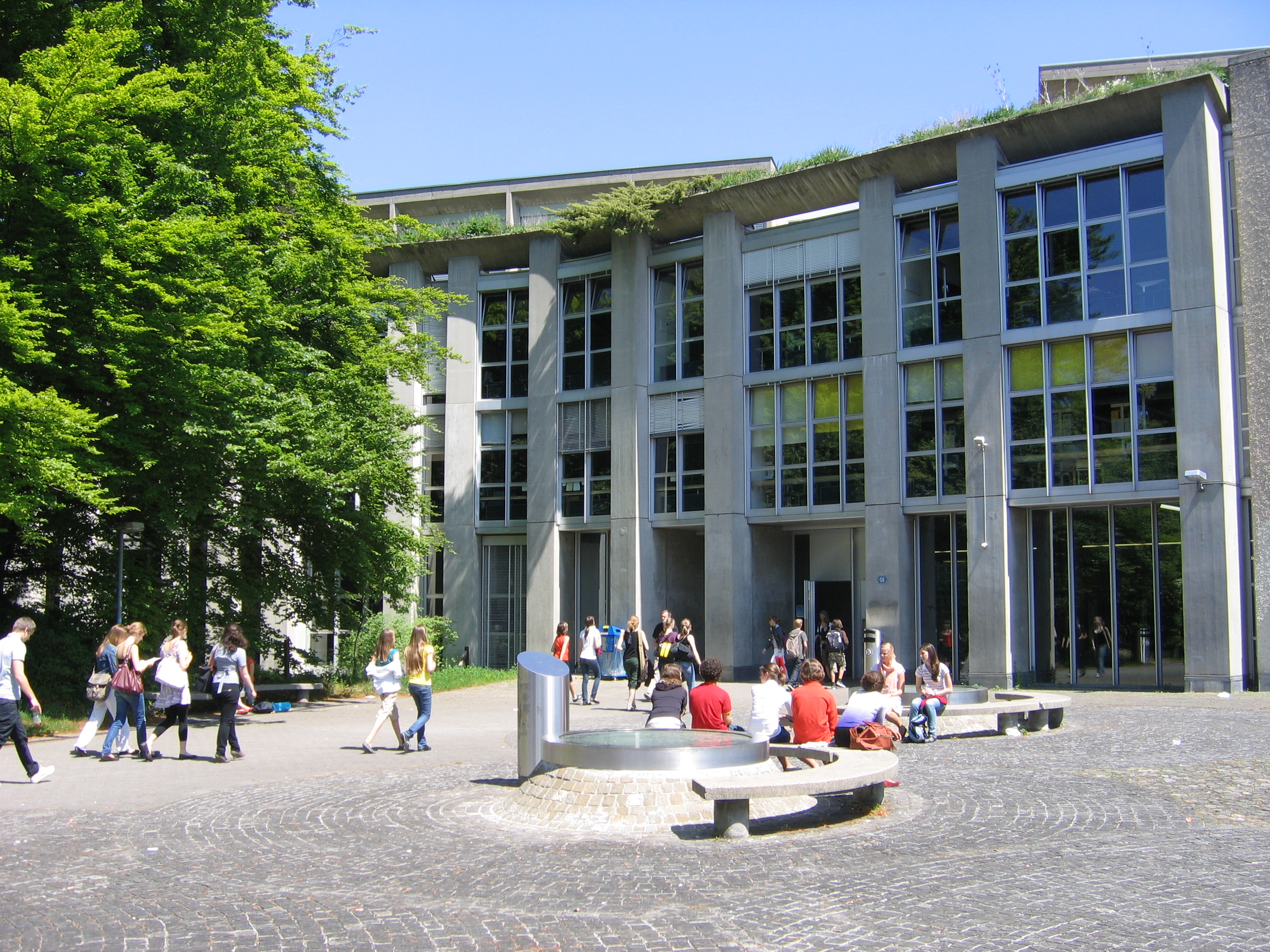
- Current school building

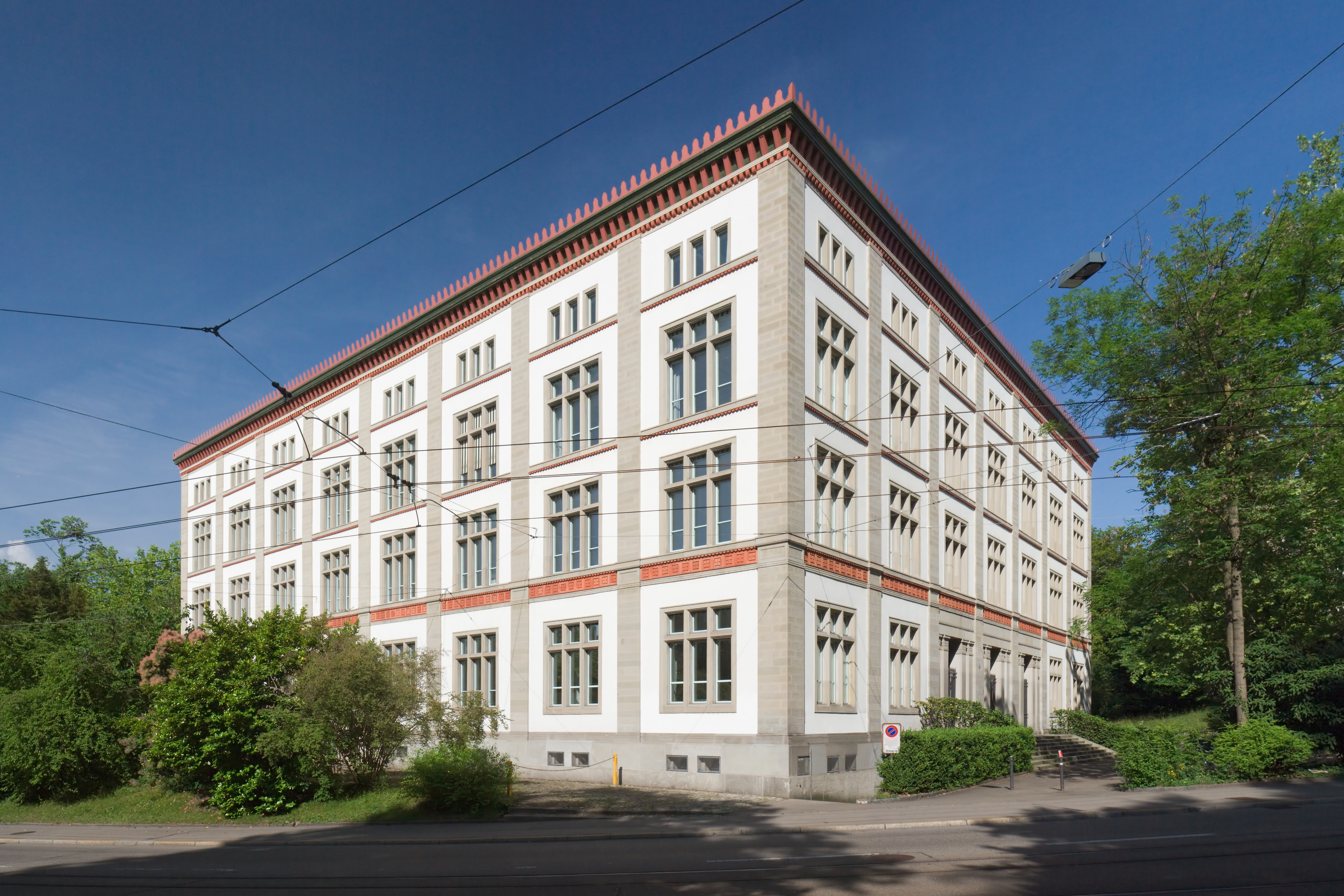
This former Rämibühl school building was erected 1842 by Gustav Albert Wegmann. It was inspired by Bauakademie.

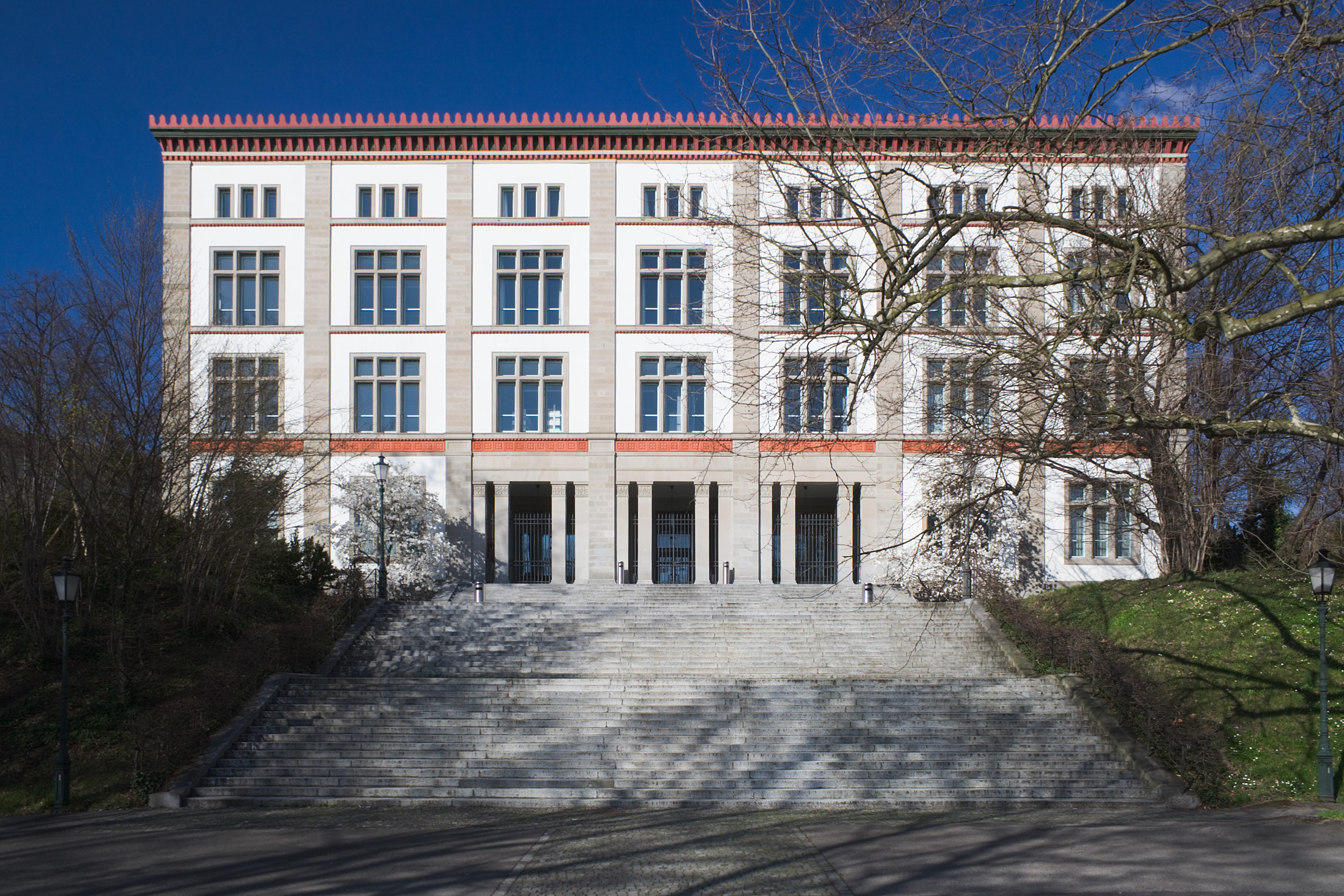
View from below

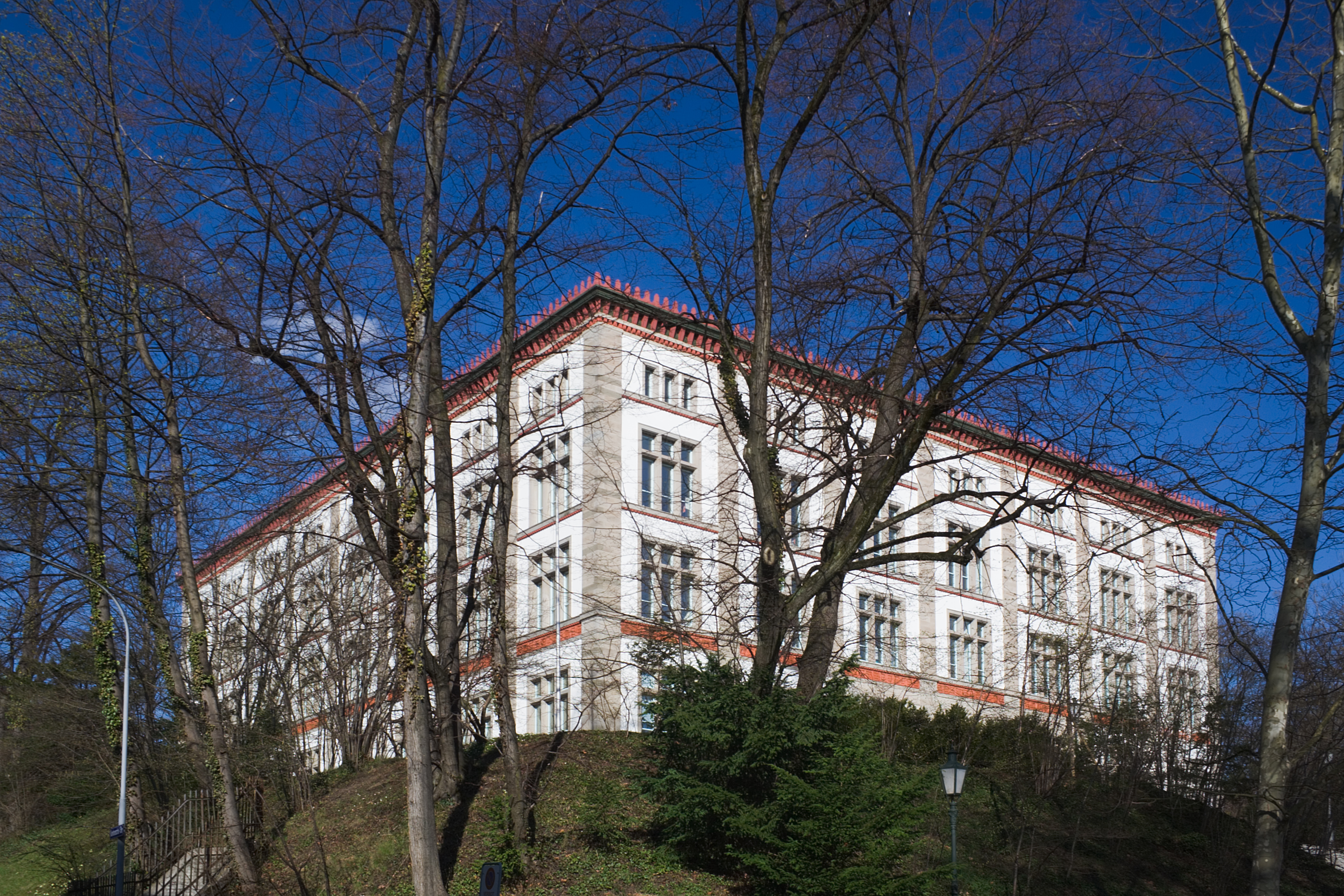
View from Kantonsschulstrasse

The Kantonsschule Rämibühl at the Rämistrasse in Zurich, founded in 1832 as "Kantonsschule Zürich" consists of four Kantonsschulen (Sekundarstufe I&II) with different curricular profiles. The four schools, which are attended by more than 2000 students in total, are the Literargymnasium, the Realgymnasium, the Mathematisch-Naturwissenschaftliches Gymnasium and the Kunst- und Sportgymnasium Rämibühl.

The Literargymnasium and the Realgymnasium, which focus on languages and humanities, were the first Swiss state-run schools to offer the International Baccalaureate Diploma Programme. Thus, in grades 9–12, some classes are taught in English (the primary language of the school being German). The Literaturgymnasium also offers extensive courses in Classics including Latin and classical Greek.

The Mathematisch-Naturwissenschaftliches Gymnasium Rämibühl (MNG) is particularly strong in mathematics and science. The school was awarded the MINT (Mathematik, Informatik, Naturwissenschaften und Technik) price for the years 2021 to 2026. The usual duration of attendance is four years. After two years, students decide to focus either on biology & chemistry or physics & applied mathematics as core subjects.

The current school headmaster is Rektorin Susanne Kalt (replacing Dr. Daniel Reichmuth in 2023) The vice-headmasters (Prorektor) Samuel Byland, Adriana Mikolaskova and Roman Staude.

The Kunst- und Sportgymnasium is attended by students which have a particular talent in arts or sports. It is located in the same building as the MNG.

All the schools support music and thus there exists not only a well-known orchestra but also various school bands as well as a department for individual musical education.They offer private lessons for free for the pupils that choose music as their artistic subject.

== History ==
The Kantonsschule Zürich was established with the Education Act of 1832 and officially founded in 1833 with two divisions: the Gymnasium and the Industrial School. It served as a preparatory institution for higher technical or academic education, in connection with the University of Zurich, which was established in the same year. The first school building on Rämistrasse was constructed in 1842. In 1904, the Industrial School was transformed into the Cantonal Commercial School, and in 1928 the Upper Secondary School (Oberrealschule) was created. Over the years, the school continued to expand, leading to space shortages that required new buildings and extensions, including a new building in 1909. Following World War II, growth led to the division of the Gymnasium into the Literargymnasium and Realgymnasium in 1947. Since 1959, further restructuring and decentralization took place. In 1976, the school became coeducational. In 1983, the schools were administratively separated. In 2015, old gymnasiums were demolished, and a relocation of the Literaturgymnasium to Mühlebachstrasse 112 in Seefeld is planned by 2026.

== Alumni ==
Some notable alumni include:

Felix Bloch (1905–1983), Nobel Prize winner in Physics in 1952. (Realgymnasiums)

Elias Canetti (1905–1994), writer, awarded the Nobel Prize in Literature in 1981. (Realgymnasiums)

Tadeus Reichstein (1897–1996) Nobel Prize winner in medicine in 1950 (Mathematisch-naturwissenschaftlichen Gymnasiums)

Gottfried Keller (1819–1890), writer (expelled from school in 1834) (Mathematisch-naturwissenschaftlichen Gymnasiums)

== Controversy ==
In July 2009, the concerned mother of a pupil anonymously filed a civil complaint against German language teacher Daniel Saladin of the Literargymnasium Rämibühl in Zurich, a German scholar, book author and high school teacher. The accusation was that the teacher had excessively exposed his pupils to pornographic literature. He was arrested, his flat and workplace at school searched, his computers confiscated. The public prosecutor's office of Zurich brought charges of "distributing pornography to minors". "Pornography" here refers to works of world literature that can be borrowed from school libraries and read in class. Among them: Frank Wedekind's Spring Awakening.

The teacher was put on trial, lost his job, and ultimately was acquitted of the charge of conducting his classes in a questionable manner. The judge criticized the public prosecutor's submission as "completely inadequate."
