= Itala Mela =

Italian Catholic theologian (1904–1957)

Blessed Itala Mela ObSB
- Born: 28 August 1904; La Spezia, Kingdom of Italy
- Died: 29 April 1957 (aged 52); La Spezia, Italy
- Resting place: La Spezia Cathedral, Italy
- Venerated in: Roman Catholic Church
- Beatified: 10 June 2017, Piazza Europa, La Spezia, Italy by Cardinal Angelo Amato
- Feast: 28 April

Itala Mela (28 August 1904 – 29 April 1957) was an Italian Roman Catholic theologian and mystic. She was a lapsed Christian until a conversion of faith in the 1920s ,and as a Benedictine oblate assumed the name Maria della Trinità. Mela became a well-known Catholic mystic and a theological writer on the Trinity.

Mela was proclaimed to be venerable on 12 June 2014 after Pope Francis approved her life of heroic virtue. On 14 December 2015 the pope also approved a miracle attributed to her intercession. Mela was beatified in La Spezia on 10 June 2017 and Cardinal Angelo Amato presided over the celebration on the pope's behalf; the miracle in question concerned the resuscitation of an Italian newborn, whose body was in state of clinical brain death.

== Life ==
Itala Mela was born on 28 August 1904 in La Spezia to Pasquino Mela and Luigia Bianchini; both were atheist teachers. She spent her childhood in the care of her maternal grandparents from 1905 to 1915 as her parents worked and her grandparents prepared Mela for her First Communion and Confirmation; she made both on 9 May 1915 and 27 May 1915 respectively.

The death of her brother Enrico at the age of nine (27 February 1920) challenged Mela's perception of her Christian faith, and she wrote of her feelings to the loss: "After his death, nothing". As a result, she eschewed her Christian faith and slipped into atheism. However she had a sudden reawakening of her faith on the Feast of the Immaculate Conception (8 Dec 1922) after rediscovering God; her faith deepened with the motto she took being: "Lord, I shall follow You unto the darkness, unto death".

Mela became a member of FUCI in 1923, where she met future pope Giovanni Battista Montini and Alfredo Ildefonso Schuster at the meetings there; she also met the priests Divo Barsotti and Agostino Gemelli. At such meetings, Montini and both the politicians Aldo Moro and Giulio Andreotti served as major influences upon her. She was the main friend of Angela Gotelli, a teacher of classic letters and a Roman Catholic partisan who was close to the political ideas of Aldo Moro.

Mela received her high school diploma at the liceo classico Lorenzo Costa of La Spezia (where she later became a teacher) with recognition of being a brilliant student and in 1922 was enrolled at the University of Genoa, where she later received a degree in letters in 1928 as well as in classical studies.

Mela experienced her first vision of God on 3 August 1928 as a beam of light at the tabernacle in a church of a seminary at Pontremoli, beginning a long stream of visions in her life. She departed for Milan at this time, and chose as her confessor Adriano Bernareggi. Her true calling as a Benedictine oblate came in 1929 and solidified to the point where she commenced her novitiate. It concluded on 4 January 1933 when she made her profession in Rome in the church of San Paolo fuori le Mura making her four vows. As a sign of her new life, Mela assumed the name of "Maria della Trinità". Mela returned to her hometown in 1933. From 1936 she received ecstasies and visions. Her mother died in 1937.

Mela presented an idea for a memorial to Pope Pius XII in 1941, and the pope accepted the Memorial of Mary of the Trinity. In Genoa from 5–15 October 1946, Mela composed a series of spiritual exercises for the benefit of the faithful; the exercises were well received.

From 18 February to 24 April 1957, despite her aphasia, she managed to make herself understood with gestures and with her eyes, her smile and the nod of her head. On 25 April at 4 pm, after a new attack, she went into a coma for four days and on 29 April at 6.30 pm, while the bells of the Church of St. John and St. Augustine ring for the Eucharistic blessing, Mela died. She was clothed in the wedding dress of one of her pupils who had become a Carmelite, a dress that had been worn by her for the day of her vesting. The little chamber in which she died was the object of the homage of a large crowd.

Her remains were later transferred to the La Spezia Cathedral's crypta in 1983.

Mela is commemorated on 28 April because 29 April is the feast of St.Catherine of Siena and St. Francis of Assisi, patron saints of Italy, and their liturgical memory would take precedence over that of Mela.

Since 1937 Mela received spiritual stigmata every Friday. She also received the gift of the transverberation of the heart (August 1938). Her adoration for the "Inabitazione" ("Inhabitation," a form of worship of the Trinity), led her to establish a religious family in 1946 consisting of priests and laymen engaged in the spread of devotion.

Santa Maria del Mare monastery in La Spezia houses a small museum about Mela, with the bedroom and other mementos.

== Beatification ==
The beatification process started in La Spezia in its diocese on 29 April 1968, which granted Mela the title Servant of God; the process spanned until 21 November 1976 and was validated in Rome on 2 October 1992. In 1983, at the canonical reconnaissance that are regularly carried out in the case of beatification processes, his body was found intact. Following the local process, all of Mela's writings were approved in 1979 and permitted for evaluation in the cause.

The Positio then was compiled and submitted in 2003 to the Congregation for the Causes of Saints for further evaluation. On the occasion of the 2006 Convention of Italian Churches in Verona, the churches of Liguria chose Mela as an exemplary witness to their heritage of faith and spirituality.

It was on 12 June 2014 that Pope Francis approved that Mela had lived a life of heroic virtue thus declared her to be Venerable.

On 14 December 2015, the pope also approved a miracle attributed to the intercession of Mela which would allow for her beatification to take place; it was celebrated at Piazza Europa in La Spezia on 10 June 2017 with Cardinal Angelo Amato presiding over the celebration on the pope's behalf. The following afternoon after his Angelus address – given on the Solemnity of the Most Holy Trinity – Pope Francis referred to her beatification in which he mentioned the real presence of "God the Father, Son and Holy Spirit who abides in the chamber of our heart".

The current postulator assigned to this cause is Dr. Andrea Ambrosi. Her writings altogether occupy more than 42 volumes. Her original writings are kept in the Diocesan Archive at the Episcopal Seminary in Sarzana. Mela's findings were typewritten by the nuns of the Benedictine Monastery of Santa Maria del Mare, Castellazzo, La Spezia.

Later, a commission of experts verified the fidelity of the typewritten copies to the originals. The archive preserves both Mela's autograph writings and typewritten copies (which are the only ones that can be consulted by the public).

In honor to Mela, the Municipality of La Spezia named a stairway between Via XXVII Marzo and Via dei Colli.

== The Trinitarian indwelling ==
The Trinitarian indwelling is a spiritual experience proposed by Mela to help the faithful live their lives in the light of the Trinity. It consists of trying to do everything in union with the Father, the Son and the Holy Spirit, relying on their guidance and always trying to do God's will.

Trinitarian indwelling is an experience that can be lived in any situation of life, not just in a convent or in a place of prayer. For Mela, in fact, daily life is the place where it is possible to meet God and bear witness to one's faith, through concrete gestures of love and charity towards others.

The Trinitarian indwelling finds foundation in the Gospel according to John, chapter 10, verses from 22 to 39 and in particular in the words "The Father is in me and I in Him". Thus, the three divine Persons inhabit each other. According to Mela, man, created in the image and likeness of God, is made to live the same life as God through the Trinitarian indwelling of the soul and body. It is not a mere intellectual fact, but an experience that concerns the person in his entirety of soul and body. Anyone who coherently lives as a Son of God can also experience this communion of love with God and with his neighbour.

Mela lived her first experiences of trinitarian indwelling after having prayed the Office of the Hours, received the Eucharist during holy mass or having practiced an intense Eucharistic adoration.

Mela immolated herself, offering her joyful suffering and infirmity to God so that other people could experience the Trinitarian indwelling, for the forgiveness of their sins and their eternal salvation.

The Trinitarian indwelling theology was also described by Elizabeth of the Trinity. It was anticipated by the Diuturnum illud of Pope Leo XIII and then confirmated by the encyclical Mystici corporis of Pius XII.

As it results from her name of "Mary of the Trinity", Mela was a devoted to the Blessed Virgin Mary. Mela conceived the sainthood of Mary and of the Saints as "nothing but a reflection, a communication of the sanctity of the triune God." According to her, "every mystery, every aspect of faith flows from the very life of the august Trinity."

Thomas Aquinas' Compendium theologiae affirms:

There is another conjunction of man with God that is brought about, not only by affection or inhabitation, but also by the unity of hypostasis or person, so that one and the same hypostasis or person is both God and man . And this conjunction of man with God is proper to Jesus Christ. We have already spoken at length of this union. In truth, this is a singular grace of the man Christ, that He is united to God in unity of person. Clearly the grace was given gratis, for it exceeds the capacity of nature, and besides, there were no merits to precede this gift. But it also makes Him supremely pleasing to God, so that the Father says of Him in a unique sense: “This is My beloved Son, in whom I am well pleased” (Matt. 3: 17; 17: 5)...

== In arts ==
In memory of Mela, Clemente Terni_{it} composed a cantata for contralto, tenor and bass with instruments and percussion, very freely inspired by the texts collected in the volume In un mare di luce and by the lauda Alta Trinità beata contained in the ancient Laudario of Cortona, dated back to the 13th century. The first performance took place in San Miniato al Monte, at the Monastery of San Leonardo, not far from the temple of San Salvatore al Monte_{it}, a microcosm of the heavenly temple frescoed by Leonardo da Vinci.

In honour to Mela, the Master friar Claudio Grana, OCD, composed the hymn Se mi ami davvero (If you truly love me) (n°. 1978). Its stanzas are taken from the Elevation to the Trinity by St Elizabeth of the Trinity.

== Works ==
- Itala Mela, Benedictine Monastery of Santa Maria a Mare (editor for stenography), Marinasco, Nel dialogo delle tre persone, Sarzana 1976 OCLC 1403424556 Retrieved on 26 January 2025. (4 notebooks; no ISBN available)
- Itala Mela, Quo tu non-vis (Dove tu non-vuoi). Itinerario spirituale, Libreria Editrice Vaticana 2002, ISBN 88-209-7286-7
- Itala Mela, In un mare di luce. Scritti mistici, Piemme 1999, ISBN 88-384-4175-8
- Itala Mela, Amare l'amore, Mondadori, ISBN 88-04-43632-8
- Itala Mela, Luigi Crippa (editor) (1 October 2014), Pensieri sull'obbedienza benedettina, Editrice Domenicana Italiana, EAN 9788898264339, ISBN 88-98264-33-X.
- Itala Mela, L'ascesi alla luce dell'Inabitazione, in Ritiri mensili 1958, 1959, 1960, 1961, Apostolato per la Comunione frequente agli ammalati, Genoa, 34 p.

Some of Mela's writings were translated into Spanish by Manuel Garrido Bonaño (1923–2013), OSB, who collaborated in the cause for beatification of Josemaría Escrivá de Balaguer at the Diocesan Tribunal of Madrid and as promoter of justice in that of Sister Eusebia Palomino Yenes.

In 2017, Annamaria Valli published a bibliography of the studies and anthologies related to Mela's writings.

=== Letters ===
In the substantial collection of Mela's letters, gathered in her typewritten volumes, there were only seven of the approximately one hundred letters sent from 1931, on the eve of her taking the veil, until 1956, a few months before her death in her house in Via del Torretto, La Spezia.

The letters were addressed to the abbots of San Paolo fuori le Mura, Ildebrando Vannucci_{it} and his successor Cesario D'Amato_{it}, and to the director of the Oblates, Fr, Giuseppe Turbessi, who was succeeded by Fr. Ippolito Boccolini_{it}.

The letters dealt with liturgical reform and the return to Gregorian chant, relaunched by Prosper Guéranger, as well as the construction of the monastery of Saint Scholastica near Civitella San Paolo, north of Rome, a proposal put forward by Schuster and implemented by Vannucci.

== See also ==
- Angela Gotelli
- Elizabeth of the Trinity
- FUCI
- Silvia Montefoschi
- Most Holy Trinity

== Bibliography ==
- Don Dr. Francesco Vannini (2017). "Itala Mela (1904–1957). Una spezzina del Novecento. Mistica dell'Inabitazione" [Itala Mela (1904–1957). A person from La Spezia lived in the twentieth century. Mystique of the Trinitarian indwelling] (PDF) (in Italian). Roman Catholic Diocese of La Spezia-Sarzana-Brugnato. p. 48. Archived from the original on 27 April 2023. (on occasion of Mela's beatification in 2017)
- Taroni, Massimiliano (2017). Itala Mela. Una mistica per il nostro tempo. Blu. Messaggeri d'amore (in Italian). Velar. p. 48. ISBN 978-88-6671-425-5.
- Sister Maria Gregoria Arzani (Benedictine Monastery of Santa Maria a Mare in Marinasco) (1 January 2002). Corpo e spirito, trasparenza di Dio. Itala Mela. Testi mistici (in Italian) (1st ed.). Libreria Editrice Vaticana. p. 192. ISBN 978-88-209-7326-1. (anthology of Mela's writings)
- Dora Lucciardi, pope Paul VI (foreword), Itala Mela nella sua esperienza e nei suoi scritti, Vita Nuova, Edizione Studium, Roma 1963 (at typography La Commerciale – Moderna – Rome, 260 p.). OCLC 898663383, OCLC 1405578204
- Giovanna Azzali Bernardelli, Un'esperienza di contemplazione distinta del prezioso sangue nella vita spirituale di Itala Mela, La vela, La Spezia 1986, 15 p (serie "Nel dialogo delle tre persone". Supplemento al n. 9 (1986) di Vitaperché: la voce del seminario, bimestrale del Centro Diocesano Vocazioni di Chiavari, Seminario Vescovile "Pio IX" (Chiavari). IT\CCU\LIG\0037616
