= Hypostasis =

Hypostasis, hypostases, hypostatic, hypostatization, or hypostatisation (Ancient Greek: ὑπόστᾰσις, romanized: hupóstasis, lit. 'under standing') may refer to:

- Hypostasis (philosophy and religion), the underlying, fundamental state or substance that supports all of reality
  - Hypostasis (linguistics), a relationship between a name and a known quantity, as a cultural personification of an entity or quality
  - Hypostasis (literature), a literary moment when characters in fiction become aware of their own fictional nature
  - Hypostasis of the Archons, a Gnostic text
  - Hypostatic model of personality, a view asserting that humans present themselves in many different aspects or hypostases, depending on the internal and external realities they relate to, including different approaches to the study of personality
  - Hypostatic union, a technical term in Christian theology employed in mainstream Christology to describe the union of Christ's humanity and divinity in one hypostasis
- Hypostasis, a type of boss in the video game Genshin Impact
- Hypostatic abstraction, a formal operation that transforms a predicate into a relation
- Hypostatic gene, a gene whose phenotype is altered by the expression of an allele at a separate locus, in an epistasis event
- Holding current (electronics), the minimum current which must pass through a circuit in order for it to remain in the 'ON' state
- Livor mortis, the second stage of death and one of the signs of death
- Reification (fallacy), a fallacy of ambiguity, when an abstraction is treated as if it were a concrete real event or physical entity
- Sediment in a liquid, including wine
