= Meta-reference =

Type of self reference

Meta-reference (or metareference) is a category of self-reference occurring in media or media artifacts such as texts, films, paintings, TV series, comic strips, and video games. It includes all references to, or comments on, a specific medium, media artifact, or the media in general. These references and comments originate from a logically higher level (a "meta-level") within any given artifact, and draw attention to—or invite reflection about—media-related issues (e.g. the production, performance, or reception) of said artifact, specific other artifacts (as in parody), or to parts, or the entirety, of the media system. It is, therefore, the recipient's awareness of an artifact's media quality that distinguishes meta-reference from more general forms of self-reference. Thus, meta-reference triggers media-awareness within the recipient, who, in turn "becomes conscious of both the medial (or "fictional" in the sense of artificial and, sometimes in addition, "invented") status of the work" as well as "the fact that media-related phenomena are at issue, rather than (hetero-)references to the world outside the media." Although certain devices, such as mise-en-abîme, may be conducive to meta-reference, they are not necessarily meta-referential themselves. However, innately meta-referential devices (e.g. metalepsis) constitute a category of meta-references.

== History ==
While meta-reference as a concept is not a new phenomenon and can be observed in very early works of art and media not tied to specific purposes (e.g. Homer's invocation of the muses at the beginning of the Odyssey in order to deliver the epic better), the term itself is relatively new. Earlier discussions of meta-referential issues often opt for more specific terminology tied to the respective discipline. Notable discussions of meta-reference include, but are not limited to, William H. Gass's and Robert Scholes's exploration of metafiction, Victor Stoichita's examination of early modern meta-painting, and Lionel Abel's investigation of metatheatre. In the context of drama, meta-reference has also become colloquially known as the breaking of the fourth wall. The first study to underscore the problem resulting from the lack of cohesive terminology, as well as the necessity to acknowledge meta-reference as a transmedia and trans-generic phenomenon, was published in 2007 by Hauthal et al. Publications by Nöth and Bishara as well as Wolf followed suit, raised similar concerns, included case studies from various media, coined and helped establish the more uniform umbrella term meta-reference as define above.

== Examples ==
While every medium has the potential for meta-reference, some media can transport meta-reference more easily than others. Media that can easily realise its meta-referential potential includes, for instance, literature, painting, and film. Although music can be meta-referential even outside the confines of lyrics, meta-reference in music is much harder to create or detect. Music, therefore, would be a less typical medium for the occurrence of meta-reference. Nöth argues in this context that although non-verbal media can be the home of meta-reference, the contained meta-reference can only be implicit because non-verbal media can only show similarities, but never point directly (or explicitly) to meta-referential elements. Others, however, argue that meta-reference is explicit as long as it is clear.

=== Literature ===
John Fowles begins chapter 13 of his novel The French Lieutenant's Woman with the words

This story I am telling is all imagination. These characters I create never existed outside my own mind. If I have pretended until now to know my characters' mind and innermost thoughts, it is because I am writing in [...] a convention universally accepted at the time of my story: that the novelist stands next to God. [emphases added]

This is an example of explicit meta-reference because the text draws attention to the fact that the novel the recipient is reading is merely a fiction created by the author. It also foregrounds the convention that readers of realist fiction accept the presence of an all-knowing narrator, and breaks it by allowing the narrator to take centre stage which invites meta-reflections by the recipient.

In American comic books published by Marvel Comics, the character Deadpool is aware that he is a fictional comic book character. He commonly breaks the fourth wall, to humorous effect. To other non-aware characters in the story, Deadpool's self-awareness as a comic book character appears to be a form of psychosis. When other characters question whether Deadpool's real name is even Wade Wilson, he jokes that his true identity depends on which writer the reader prefers.

=== Film ===
The Truman Show is a movie that contains a high degree of meta-reference. Truman, the protagonist, is unaware that he is part of a reality TV show, but the audience knows about the artificiality of both Truman's life and, by extension, the movie that is being watched. This is underscored by putting emphasis on the production process of the fictional reality TV show, which makes the audience aware of the same features being used in the movie at the time of watching. Further examples of meta-reference in the movie include spotlights falling from the sky seemingly out of the blue, or a raincloud which is curiously only raining on Truman following him around on Seahaven Beach. Both instances point to the artificiality of Truman's life as well as the film itself.

Other examples include films by Mel Brooks, such as Blazing Saddles, which becomes a story about the production of the film, and Silent Movie is a silent movie about producing a silent movie. Additionally, The Muppet Movie and its sequels frequently showed characters referring to the movie script to see what should happen next.

=== Painting ===
External image
- Manet's Balcony by Magritte

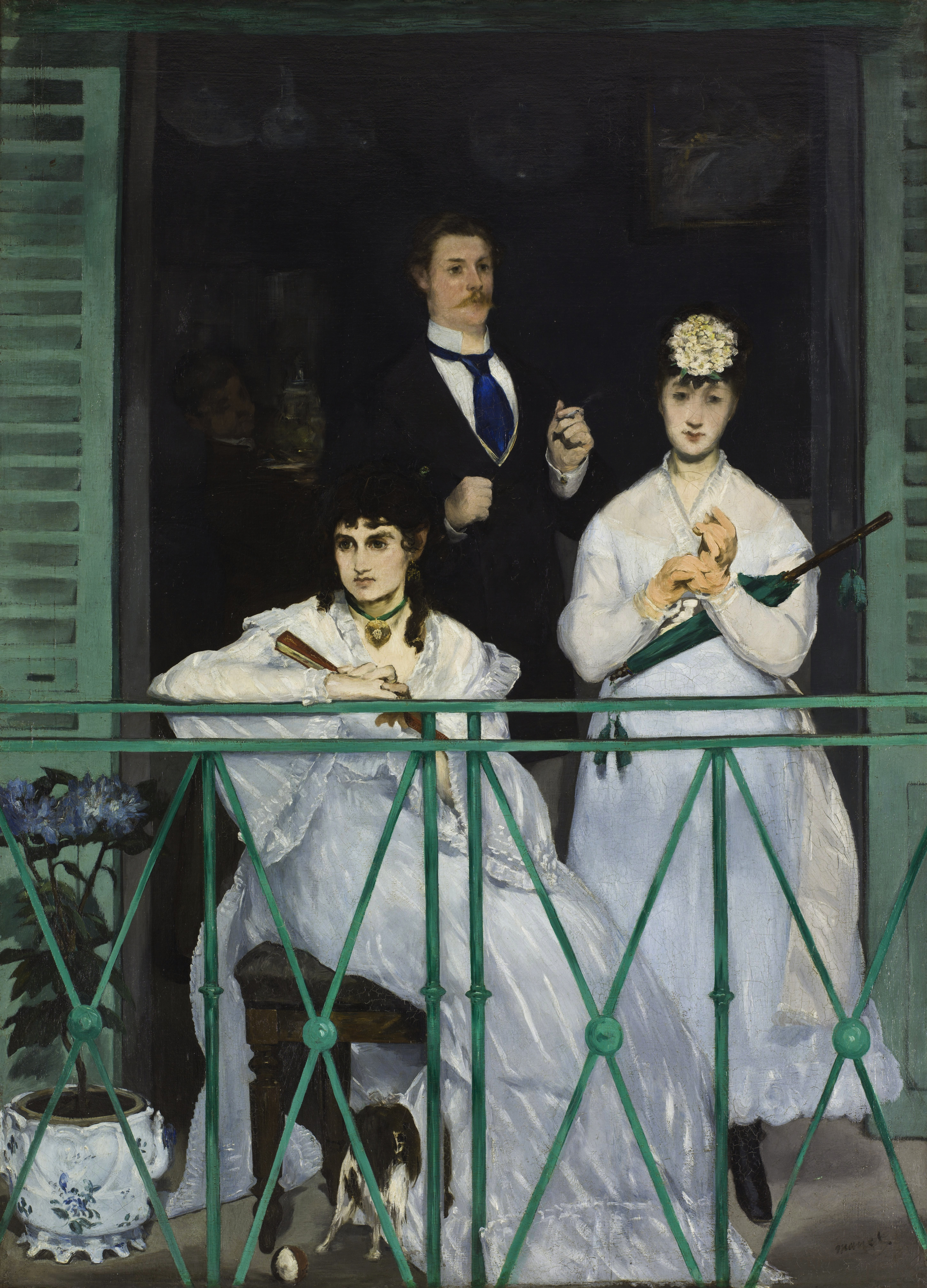
Manet, The Balcony

An example of meta-reference in painting is Manet's Balcony by René Magritte. It comments on another painting, The Balcony by Édouard Manet, by mimicking both the setting of the balcony as well as the poses of the depicted people, but places them in coffins. Thus, the recipient's attention is drawn to the fact that not only are the people in the painting long dead and only still "alive" in the representation, but arguably also that the artist (Manet) and the impressionist painting style are just as dead as the portrayed individuals. Furthermore, it is foregrounded that the impressionist painting style is just a style that may be copied, which further emphasises the fact that both works are only paintings created in a specific way.

== See also ==
- Frame story – Story in a nested narration that brackets one or more embedded stories
- Induction
- Hypostasis – Literary device in metafiction
- Meta- – Productive prefix in English derived from Greek
- Metacomic – Type of comic
- Meta-discussion – Discussion of discussion
- Meta-joke – Humor that alludes to itself
- Metaknowledge – Knowledge about knowledge
- Self-reference – Sentence, idea or formula that refers to itself
- Story within a story – Literary device
- Mise en abyme – Literary technique
- Metafiction – Genre of fiction about fiction
- Metatheatre – Aspects of a play that draw attention to its nature as a play
- Metalepsis – Figure of speech
- Metafilm – Self-reflexive mode of filmmaking
