= Laudario di Cortona =

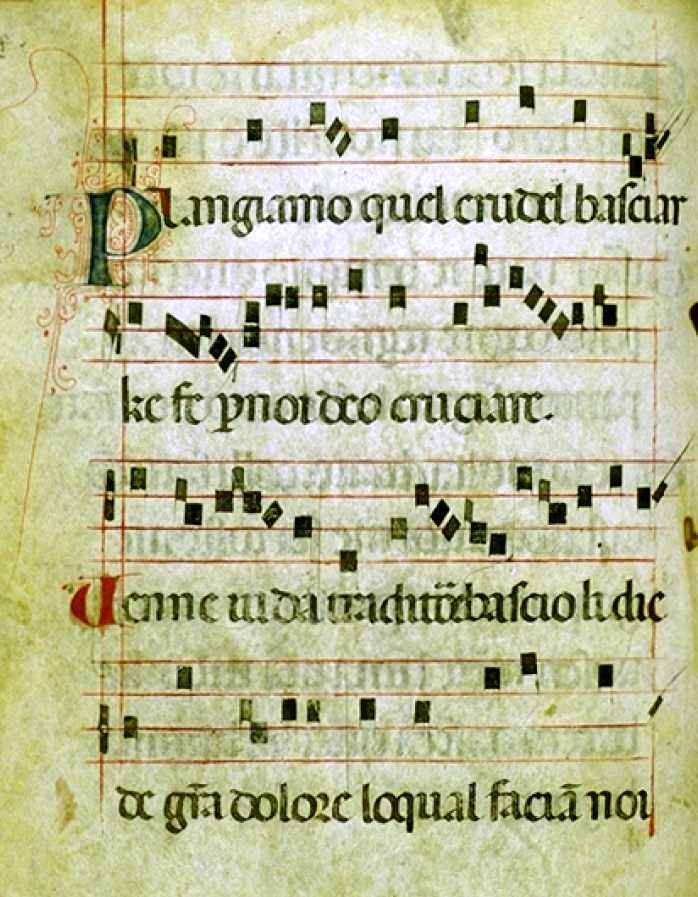
Folio 46v of the Laudario di Cortona, with the song "Plangiamo quel crudel basciar[e]"

The Laudario di Cortona (Cortona, Biblioteca del Comune e dell'Accademia Etrusca, Ms. 91) is a musical codex (manuscript book) from the second half of the 13th century containing a collection of laude. It is the oldest known source of music in the Italian language, and the only such source from the thirteenth century. It is one of only two sources of Italian laude to contain musical notation.

== The manuscript ==
The manuscript contains 66 laude of which only the first 44 have notated music. In a section inserted subsequently there are a further two laude with their music, making 46 in total. The first sixteen are in praise of Mary, while the remainder roughly follow the feast days of the liturgical year. They are without doubt part of a larger repertoire of laude that predated the manuscript. There is evidence that some of the Cortona laude are modified versions of pre-existing laude which have been given extra verses or had verses removed.

The precise date of the manuscript is uncertain, but it appears to have been copied between 1270 and 1297. The manuscript belonged to the fraternity of Santa Maria delle Laude at the church of San Francesco in Cortona, Italy. It was found in 1876, discarded and in poor condition, by Girolamo Mancini, who was the librarian of the Biblioteca del Comune e dell'Accademia Etrusca di Cortona. He donated it to the Cortona library in which it is now kept.

There is, however, a significant problem in transcribing and performing the repertoire in the manuscript. It is "chock full of errors" in the words of one scholar. For example, there are numerous places where the scribe appears to have used the wrong clef, resulting in unlikely jumps in the melodic line.

== The music ==
The music is notated in square black plainchant notation, entirely without accidentals which would presumably been inserted automatically in performance. However, this lack of accidentals poses significant problems for modern reconstruction of the melodies.

The music is simple and melodious – it has what Karp calls a 'sturdy charm'. Typically, the laudi are of the form of a ripresa (chorus) and strophes (verses). The ripresa is a short, with two or four lines, and the strophe is longer, with up to eight lines. The music for the verse and ripresa sections are completely different from one another. Many of the Cortona laudi follow this pattern. Another common group has a simpler structure with just two alternating musical phrases.

Only the refrain and the first of the strophes are provided with music. Unfortunately, there are many instances where subsequent strophes fit the music badly, due having to the wrong number of syllables to fit the notated music, and this poses one of the many difficulties in editing and performing these works.

But the main problem, as with all notated music of this period, is that the notation gives the pitch of the note but not its duration. This has led some musicologists to publish rhythmless editions of the music using equal note values, on the basis that, as van der Weff put it, "they were of more or less equal duration." However, the conviction that there was a strong rhythmic element to the laude, based on contemporary references, led other musicologists to investigate possible ways of reconstructing their metre and rhythms using the patterns of stress in the syllables of the text. Unfortunately, this process can still yield several equally plausible versions of the same melody, as Daolmi has demonstrated. This means that any performing version of the laude is conjectural to some extent.

=== Modern editions ===
The first modern edition was published by Fernando Liuzzi in 1935. This edition has been criticised for many editorial interventions. Liuzzi added key signatures and a great number of accidentals to a repertoire in which none were notated. He even added performance directions such as Mosso con fierezza, which, as one commentator has pointed out, seem more appropriate to the nineteenth century than the thirteenth. Since then there have been several further editions : Pellegrino M. Ernetti and Laura Rossi Leidi (1980), Luigi Lucchi (1987), Clemente Terni (1988), Martin Dürrer (1996), and Hans Tischler (2002).

== Works ==
Nº	Folio	Lauda (click to sort alphabetically)	Also found in
1	1–3v	Venite a laudare	ARE, MIL
2	3v–5v	Lauda novella sia cantata	ARE
3	5v–8v	Ave, donna santissima	ARE, M18, M19, MIL
4	8v–10	Madonna santa Maria	ARE, MIL
5	12v–14v	Ave, regina gloriosa
6	14v–17	Da ciel venne messo novello	ARE, M18, M19
7	17–19v	Altissima luce col grande splendore	ARE, M18, M19, MIL
8	19v–22	Fami cantar l'amor di la beata	ARE, M19
9	22–24	O Maria, d'omelia	ARE
10	24–25v	Regina sovrana de gram pietade	ARE, M18, M19
11	25v–27	Ave, Dei genitrix
12	27–29	O Maria, Dei cella
13	29–32v	Ave, vergene gaudente	MIL
14	32v–34v	O divina virgo, flore
15	34v–36v	Salve, salve, virgo pia	MIL
16	36v–38	Vergene donçella da Dio amata	ARE, M18, M19, MIL
17	38v–39v	Peccatrice, nominata	ARE, M19
18	39v–43v	Cristo è nato et humanato	M18 (Incomplete), W15
19	43v–44v	Gloria 'n cielo e pace 'n terra	ARE, MIL
20	45–46	Stella nuova 'n fra la gente	ARE, M19, MIL
21	46v–47v	Plangiamo quel crudel basciar[e]
22	47v–51	Ben è crudele e spietoso	M18 (Text only)
23	51–53	De la crudel morte de Cristo	ARE, MIL
24	53–55	Dami conforto, Dio, et alegrança	ARE, MIL
25	55–57v	Onne homo ad alta voce	ARE, M18, CBC, MIL
26	57v–60	Jesù Cristo glorioso	M18
27	60–63	Laudamo la resurrectione	ARE, MIL, NY
28	63–64v	Spiritu sancto, dolçe amore	M19, MIL
29	64v–68	Spirito Sancto glorioso	ANT, M19, MIL
30	68–69v	Spirito sancto, dà servire	ARE, MIL
31	70–72	Alta Trinità beata	M19, MIL
32	72–82v	Troppo perde 'l tempo ki ben non t'ama	ARE, MIL
33	82v–85	Stomme allegro et latioso	MIL
34	85v–88v	Oimè lasso e freddo lo mio core
35	88v–90	Chi vol(e) lo mondo desprecçare	ARE, M19, MIL
36	90v–93	Laudar vollio per amore	MIL
37	93–96	Sia laudato san Francesco	ARE, M18, M19, MIL
38	96–100v	Ciascun ke fede sente	ARE, M18, M19, MIL
39	100v–110v	Magdalena degna da laudare	ARE, MIL
40	110v–112v	L'alto prençe archangelo lucente	MIL
41	112v–114v	Faciamo laude a tutt'i sancti	ARE, M18, M19, MIL, W22
42	114v–116	San Jovanni al mond'è nato
43	116–117v	Ogn'om canti novel canto	M19
44	117v–120	Amor dolçe sença pare	ARE, MIL
45	123–131v	Benedicti et llaudati	MIL
46	131v–132v	Salutiam divotamente	ARE, MIL
47	136	Alleluya. Alleluya, alto re di gloria*	ARE, M18, M19
48	137	Salutiam divotamente*	ARE, MIL
49	143	A voi gente facciam prego*	ARE, M18, M19
	*These laude are given in text only

Works found in other manuscripts

- ANT – Antwerp, Museum Mayer van den Bergh 303 (Text only)
- ARE – Laudario di Arezzo (Arezzo, Biblioteca Comunale 180 della Fraternità dei Laici) (Text only)
- M18 – Laudario Magliabechiano 18 (Florence, Biblioteca Nazionale Centrale, Magliabechiano II I 122, Banco Rari 18) (with music notated)
- M19 – Laudario Magliabechiano 19 (Florence, Biblioteca Nazionale Centrale, Magliabechiano II I 212, Banco Rari 19) (Text only)
- CBC – Florence, Carlo Bruscoli Collection (Text only)
- MIL – Laudario di Milano (Milan, Biblioteca Trivulziana 535) (Text only)
- NY – New York, Robert Lehman Collection (formerly Smith Collection, Worcester, Mass.) (Text only)
- W15 – Washington, National Gallery of Art, Rosenwald Collection B-15, 393 (Text only)
- W22 – Washington, National Gallery of Art, Rosenwald Collection B-22, 128 (Text only)
