= Mise en abyme =

Technique of placing a copy of an image within itself, or a story within a story

Las Meninas by Velázquez, used by Gide to demonstrate the technique of mise en abyme

Infinite abyss of similar star polygons

In Western art history, mise en abyme (French pronunciation: [miz ɑ̃n‿abim]; also mise en abîme) is the technique of placing a copy of an image within itself, often in a way that suggests an infinitely recurring sequence. In film theory and literary theory, it refers to the story within a story technique.

The term is derived from heraldry, and means placed into abyss (exact middle of a shield). It was first appropriated for modern criticism by the French author André Gide. A common sense of the phrase is the visual experience of standing between two mirrors and seeing an infinite reproduction of one's image. Another is the Droste effect, in which a picture appears within itself, in a place where a similar picture would realistically be expected to appear. The Droste effect is named after the 1904 package of Droste cocoa, which depicts a woman holding a tray bearing a Droste cocoa package, which bears a smaller version of her image.

== Heraldry ==
Coat of arms of the United Kingdom, 1816–1837

In the terminology of heraldry, the abyme or abisme is the center of a coat of arms. The term mise en abyme (also called inescutcheon) then meant “put/placed in the center”. It described a coat of arms that appears as a smaller shield in the center of a larger one.

A complex example of mise en abyme is seen in the coat of arms of the United Kingdom for the period 1801–1837, as used by Kings George III, George IV and William IV. The Imperial Crown of the Holy Roman Empire is placed en abyme within the escutcheon of Hanover, which in turn is en abyme within the arms of England, Scotland, and Ireland.

== Medieval examples ==
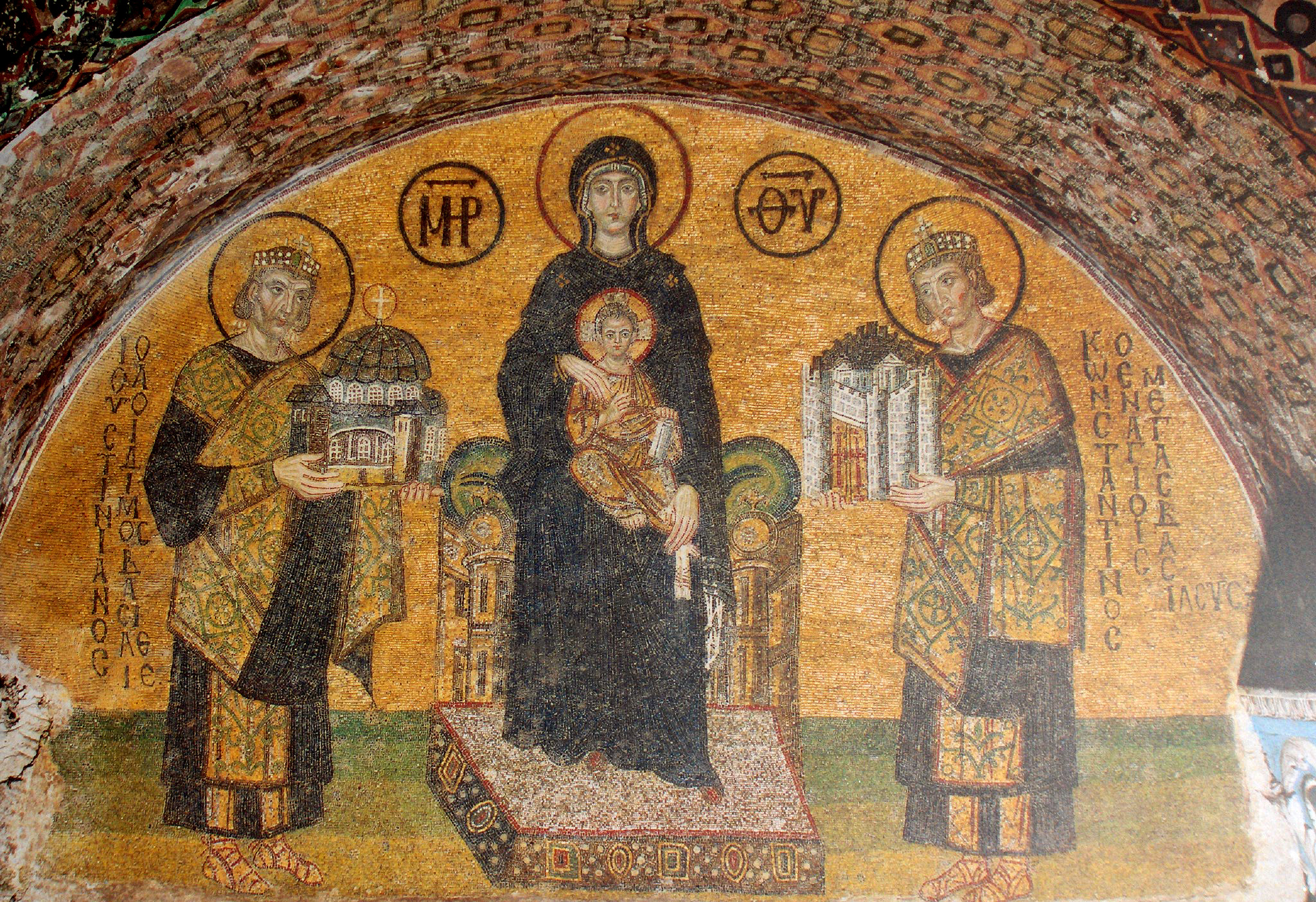
Southwestern entrance mosaic of Hagia Sophia, Constantinople, depicting both Hagia Sophia itself and Constantinople, both offered to Jesus and the Virgin Mary

While art historians working on the early-modern period adopted this phrase and interpreted it as showing artistic "self-awareness", medievalists tended not to use it. Many examples, however, can be found in the pre-modern era.

Medieval examples can be found in the collection of articles Medieval mise-en-abyme: the object depicted within itself, in which Jersey Ellis conjectures that the self-references sometimes are used to strengthen the symbolism of gift-giving by documenting the act of giving on the object itself. An example of this self-referential gift-giving appears in the Stefaneschi Triptych in the Vatican Museum, which features Cardinal Giacomo Gaetani Stefaneschi as the giver of the altarpiece.

== Critical theory and art history ==
In Western art history, mise en abyme is a formal technique in which an image contains a smaller copy of itself, in a sequence appearing to recur infinitely; "recursion" is another term for this. The modern meaning of the phrase originates with the author André Gide who used it to describe self-reflexive embeddings in various art forms and to describe what he sought in his work. As examples, Gide cites both paintings such as Las Meninas by Diego Velázquez and literary forms such as William Shakespeare's use of the "play within a play" device in Hamlet, where a theatrical company presents a performance for the characters that illuminate a thematic aspect of the play itself. This use of the phrase mise en abyme was picked up by scholars and popularized in the 1977 book Le récit spéculaire. Essai sur la mise en abyme by Lucien Dällenbach.

== In mass media ==
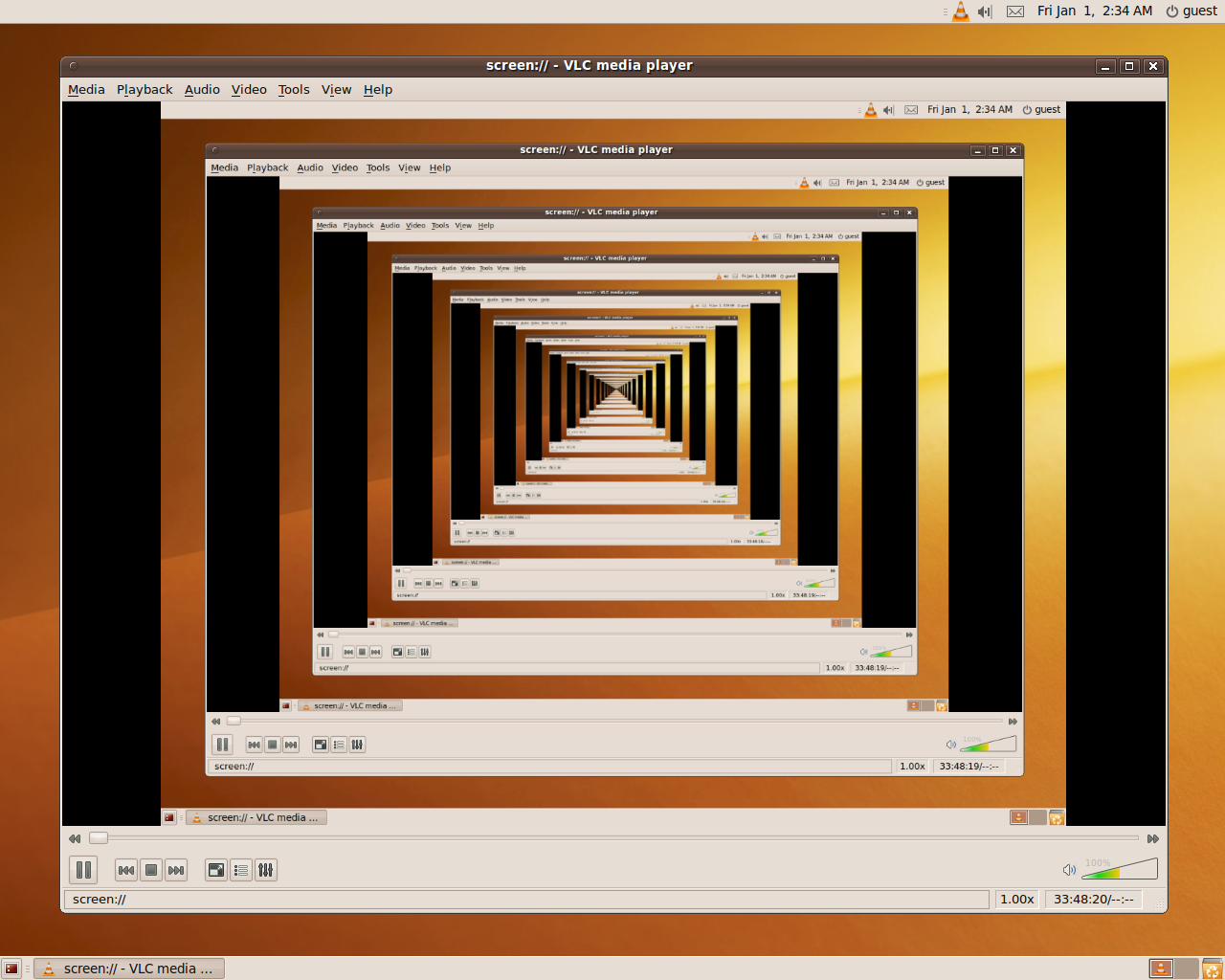
Recursive computer screenshots

Mise en abyme occurs in a text when there is a reduplication of images or concepts referring to the textual whole. Mise en abyme is a play of signifiers within a text, of sub-texts mirroring each other. This mirroring can attain a level where meaning may become unstable and, in this respect, may be seen as part of the process of deconstruction. The film-within-a-film, where a film contains a plot about the making of a film, is an example of mise en abyme. The film being made within the film refers, through its mise en scène, to the real film being made. The spectator sees film equipment, stars getting ready for the take, and crew sorting out the various directorial needs. The narrative of the film within the film may directly reflect the one in the real film. An example is Björk's video Bachelorette, directed by Michel Gondry; another is Day for Night (1973), directed by François Truffaut.

In film, the meaning of mise en abyme is similar to the artistic definition, but also includes the idea of a "dream within a dream". For example, a character awakens from a dream and later discovers that they are still dreaming. Activities similar to dreaming, such as unconsciousness and virtual reality, also are described as mise en abyme. This is seen in the film eXistenZ where the two protagonists never truly know whether or not they are out of the game. It also becomes a prominent element of Charlie Kaufman's Synecdoche, New York (2008). More recent instances can be found in the films Inland Empire (2007) and Inception (2010). Classic film examples include the snow globe in Citizen Kane (1941) which provides a clue to the film's core mystery, and the discussion of Edgar Allan Poe's written works (particularly "The Purloined Letter") in the Jean-Luc Godard film Band of Outsiders (1964).

In literary criticism, mise en abyme is a type of frame story, in which the core narrative may be used to illuminate some aspect of the framing story. The term is used in deconstruction and deconstructive literary criticism as a paradigm of the intertextual nature of language, that is, of the way, language never quite reaches the foundation of reality because it refers in a frame-within-a-frame way, to another language, which refers to another language, and so forth.

In video games, the first chapter of the game There Is No Game: Wrong Dimension (2020) is titled "Mise en abyme".

In comedy, the final act of The Inside Outtakes (2022) by Bo Burnham contains a chapter titled "Mise en abyme". It shows footage being projected into a monitor that is captured by the camera, slightly delayed at each step. This effect highlights the disconnection between Burnham and the project during the artistic process.

== See also ==
- Examples of mise en abyme in other media – Literary technique
- Fractal – Infinitely detailed mathematical structure
- Gödel, Escher, Bach (1979 book) – 1979 book by Douglas Hofstadter
- Macbeth (1971 film) – 1971 film by Roman Polanski
- Matryoshka doll – Russian nested wooden toy
- Meta-reference – Type of self reference
- Print Gallery (M. C. Escher) – Lithograph printed in 1956 by the Dutch artist M. C. Escher
- Quine (computing) – Self-replicating program
- Recursion – Process of repeating items in a self-similar way
- Self-similarity – Whole of an object being mathematically similar to part of itself
- Tamanna (2014 film) – 2014 film directed by Steven Moore
