= Holding current =

The term holding current may refer to:

- Holding current (electronics) is the minimum current which must pass through the device in order for it to remain in the 'ON' state
- Holding voltage (physiology), in electrophysiology, specifically while voltage clamping a cell, the holding current is the current that is passed into the cell in order to hold it at the command potential
