= La Spezia Cathedral =

Roman Catholic cathedral in La Spezia, Italy

Coordinates: 44°06′29.98″N 9°49′39.88″E

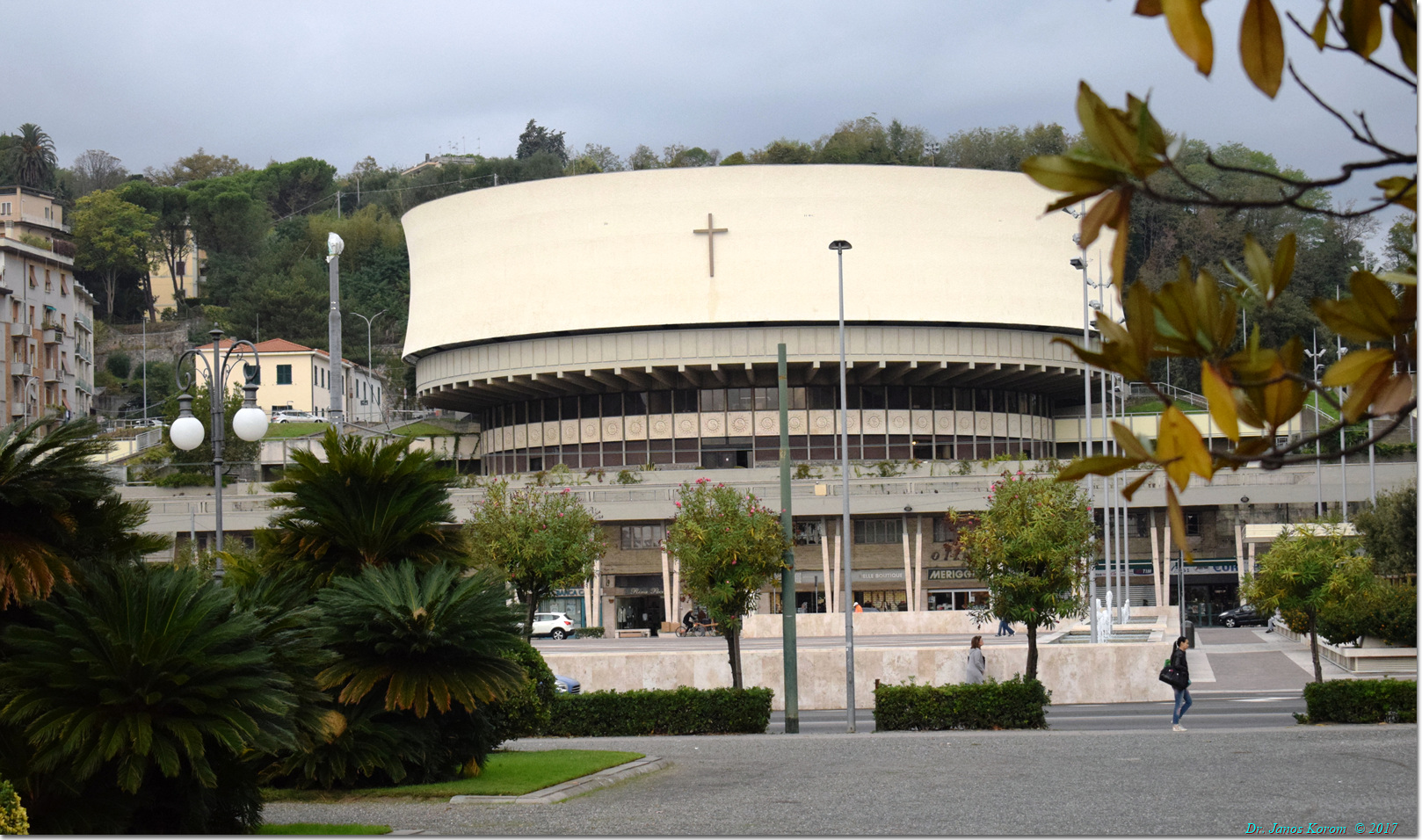
La Spezia Cathedral

La Spezia Cathedral (Italian: Duomo della Spezia; Cattedrale di Cristo Re; "Cathedral of Christ King") is a Roman Catholic cathedral in La Spezia, Italy. It is the cathedral of the Diocese of La Spezia-Sarzana-Brugnato. It was built between 1956 and 1975, according to designs by Adalberto Libera.

== History ==
La Spezia became an episcopal seat in 1927 when Pope Pius XI created the new Diocese of La Spezia-Sarzana-Brugnato. The ancient church of the Abbey of Santa Maria Assunta was elevated to the status of pro-cathedral for the new diocese on 19 March 1929. Still, theconstruction project of a new cathedral was immediately set in motion. The chosen site was on a hilltop cleared at that time to link the historic districts in the centre of the town with those to the east, where they previously had stood a Capuchin friary.

== The project ==
A competition was announced, in which the winning entry was that of the architect Brenno Del Giudice, Still, the works were postponed by more than 25 years until the mid-1950s and Del Giudice's designs were never implemented.

In the revived project of 1956, the Rationalist architect Adalberto Libera was chosen, who availed himself of the potential of the elevated site on the vast Piazza Europa to emphasise the monumentality of the religious building.

On the death of Libera in 1963, the building was still unfinished, and its completion was entrusted to the local architect Cesare Galeazzi, who resumed construction, incorporating some variations of his own. In 1975, the works were completed, and the cathedral was consecrated and dedicated to Christ King of the Ages (Cristo Re dei Secoli).

== Architecture ==
The exterior of the imposing structure is strongly characterised by its circular plan and the external wall, in the shape of a hyperboloid of one sheet, without any openings. The large churchyard, in part a garden, faces uphill and open three entrance portals onto it .

The interior receives light from the opening in the centre of the vast cupola, with a diameter of 50 metres, supported by 12 massive columns symbolising the Apostles. A second source of light comes from a band of stained glass windows running around the perimeter of the main space. The pavement of white and grey marble, slightly sloping, converges towards the central altar of white marble, while the presbytery, paved in red marble, is slightly raised.

In the vaulted crypt are preserved the reliquary of San Venerio (Saint Venerius the Hermit) and the tombs of Itala Mela (a mystic of La Spezia) and of the first bishops of the diocese, Monsignor Giovanni Costantini (bishop from 1929 to 1943) and Monsignor Giuseppe Stella (1898–1989, bishop from 1943 to 1975); in a space adjoining the sacristy of the crypt is the tomb of the third bishop, Monsignor Siro Silvestri (1913–1997, bishop from 1975 to 1989).

== Works of art ==
At the centre of the main space is a wooden crucifix from the 18th century. The altar, the ambo and the tabernacle of Carrara marble are all works of the sculptor Lia Godano. The baptistry, the choir, the pews and the confessional are the designs of Cesare Galeazzi. The Deposition of Christ is a bronze by Angiolo Del Santo.

== Bibliography ==
- P. Cevini: Le città della Liguria - La Spezia. Sagep:Genova 1984
- A. Alieri, M. Clerici, F. Palpacelli, G. Vaccaro: Adalberto Libera (1903-1963), in L'architettura. Cronache e storia, n anno XII n. 6, 1966
