= Angela Gotelli =

Italian politician (1905–1996)

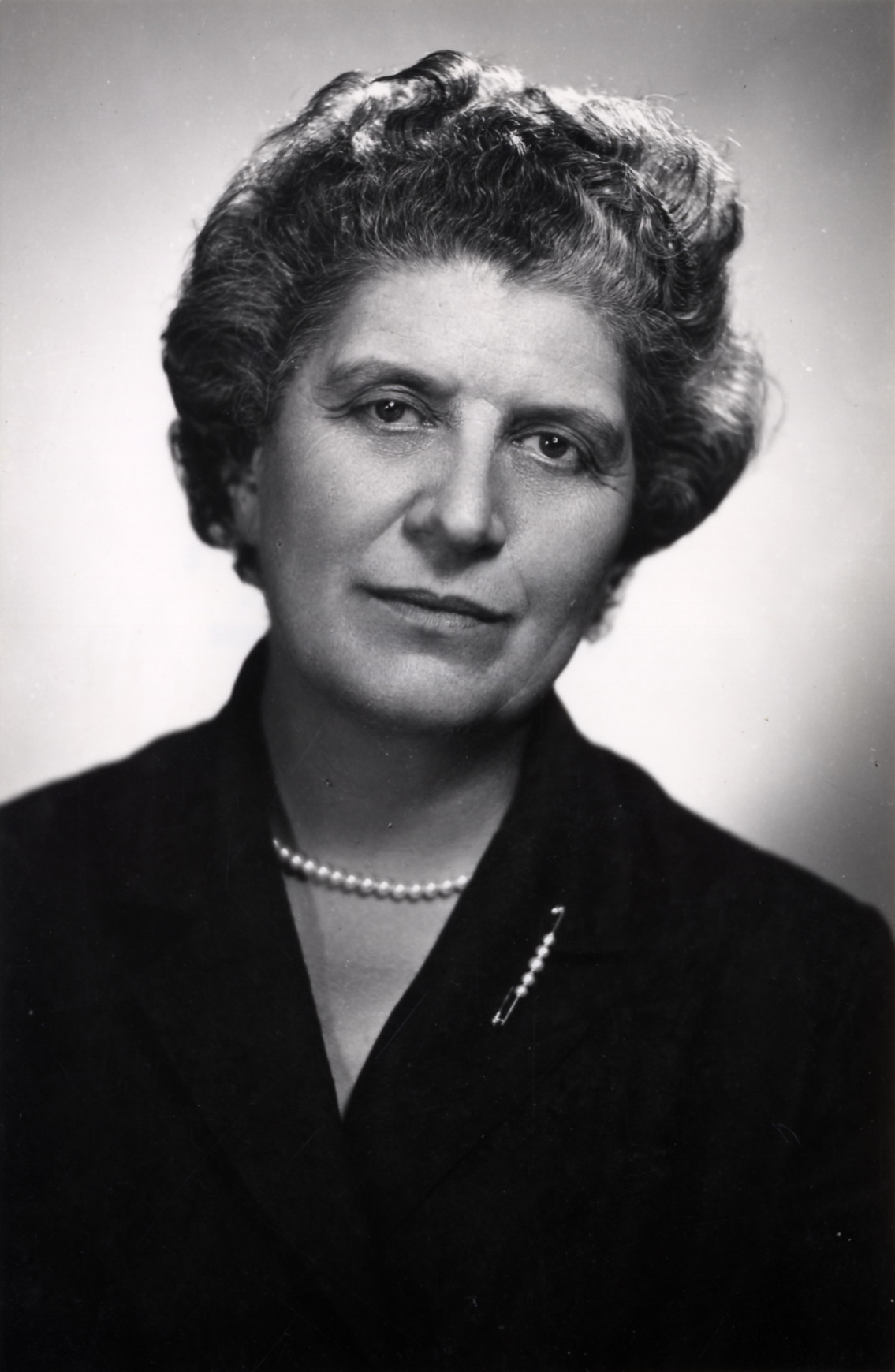
- Official portrait, 1948

Member of the Chamber of Deputies
- In office 8 May 1948 – 15 May 1963
- Constituency: Genoa

Member of the Constituent Assembly
- In office 25 June 1946 – 31 January 1948
- Constituency: Genoa

Mayor of Albareto
- In office 1951–1958
- Preceded by: Giuseppe Grilli
- Succeeded by: Marco Botti

Personal details
- Born: 25 February 1905 Albareto, Kingdom of Italy
- Died: 21 November 1996 (aged 91) Albareto, Italy
- Party: Christian Democracy
- Occupation: Politician; activist
- Profession: Teacher

Angela Gotelli (25 February 1905 – 21 November 1996) was an Italian politician, educator and activist. She served in the Chamber of Deputies as a member of Christian Democracy.

The daughter of Domenico Gotelli, a doctor, and Tullia Fattori, she was born in San Quirico, part of Albareto, Emilia-Romagna. She attended high school in La Spezia and went on to study literature and philosophy at the University of Genoa. During her time in university, she was a member of the Italian Catholic Federation of University Students (FUCI). Gotelli become a close friend of the Blessed Itala Mela and knew personally the future Pope Paul VI. She was later named FUCI delegate for northeast Italy. After graduating, she taught school in Pontremoli and Trieste. She was national president for the FUCI from 1929 to 1933, working with Igino Righetti.

At the start of World War II, she took a course with the Red Cross in La Spezia and served in Brindisi. She later took care of the sick and wounded in Albareto. She took part in the drafting of the Codice di Camaldoli in July 1943. From 1943 to 1945, Gotelli participated in the Italian resistance movement. She was also involved in the exchange of hostages with the Germans.

She moved to Rome in 1945. From 1946 to 1950, she served as national delegate for the Movimento femminile cattolico (Catholic women's movement). In 1950, she joined the "Porcellino" group, a left-wing Christian group. Gotelli was elected to the Constituent Assembly of Italy in 1946. She was elected to the Italian Chamber of Deputies in 1948, 1953 and 1958, serving as undersecretary of Health. She was forced to withdraw from political activities during the early 1970s for health reasons.

She served as mayor of Albareto from 1951 to 1958.

Gotelli died in Albareto at the age of 91.

== Electoral history ==
Election	House	Constituency	Party	Votes	Result
1946	Constituent Assembly	Genoa–Imperia–La Spezia–Savona	DC	20,257	Elected
1948	Chamber of Deputies	Genoa–Imperia–La Spezia–Savona	DC	35,850	Elected
1953	Chamber of Deputies	Genoa–Imperia–La Spezia–Savona	DC	25,012	Elected
1958	Chamber of Deputies	Genoa–Imperia–La Spezia–Savona	DC	22,466	Elected
