= Mise en abyme (in literature and other media) =

Literary technique

Mise en abyme (also mise-en-abîme, French "put in the abyss", [miːz ɒn əˈbɪːm]) is a transgeneric and transmedial technique that can occur in any literary genre, in comics, film, painting or other media. It is a form of similarity and/or repetition, and hence a variant of self-reference. Mise en abyme presupposes at least two hierarchically different levels. A subordinate level 'mirrors' content or formal elements of a primary level.

'Mirroring' can mean repetition, similarity or even, to a certain extent, contrast. The elements thus ‘mirrored’ can refer to form (e.g. a painting within a painting) or content (e.g. a theme occurring on different levels).

Mise en abyme can be differentiated according to its quantitative, qualitative and functional features. For instance, ‘mirroring’ can occur once, several times (on a lower and yet on a lower and so on level) or (theoretically) an infinite number of times (as in the reflection of an object between two mirrors, which creates the impression of a visual abyss). Further, mise en abyme can either be partial or complete (i.e. mirror part or all of the upper level) and either probable, improbable or paradoxical. It can contribute to the understanding of a work, or lay bare its artificiality.

== History ==
Coat of Arms of the United Kingdom

The term mise en abyme derives from heraldry. It describes the appearance of a smaller shield in the center of a larger one; see for example the Royal coat of arms of the United Kingdom (in the form used between 1801 and 1837). André Gide, in an 1893 entry into his journal, was the first to write about mise en abyme in connection with describing self-reflexive embeddings in various forms of art.

The term enters the lexicon through Claude-Edmonde Magny who described the aesthetic effects of the device. Jean Ricardou developed the concept further by outlining some of its functions. On the one hand it may confuse and disrupt the work in question, but on the other hand it may enhance understanding e.g. by pointing out the work's true meaning or intention. Lucien Dällenbach continues the research in a magisterial study by classifying and describing various forms and functions of mise en abyme.

== Examples ==
Mise en abyme is not restricted to a specific kind of literature or art. The recursive appearance of a novel within a novel, a play within a play, a picture within a picture, or a film within a film form mises en abyme that can have many different effects on the perception and understanding of the literary text or work of art.

Marriage à-la-Mode 4: The Toilette by William Hogarth (1697-1764)

=== Painting: Marriage à-la mode 4: The Toilette by William Hogarth ===
Mariage à-la-Mode (1743–45) is a narrative series of six socially and morally critical paintings by William Hogarth. In the fourth painting, Mariage à-la-Mode 4: The Toilette, an example of mise en abyme can be found. The man on the right is not the woman's husband, however they are clearly flirting and are possibly arranging a meeting at night. The paintings above their heads depict sexual scenes, foreshadowing what is going to happen.

=== Drama: Hamlet by William Shakespeare ===
Another example of mise en abyme would be a novel within a novel, or a play within a play. In William Shakespeare's Hamlet the title character stages a play within the play (“The Murder of Gonzago”) to find out whether his uncle really murdered his father as the ghost of his father has told him. It is not only a formal mirroring of a theatrical situation (a play within a play) but also a mirroring of a content element, namely of what supposedly had happened in the pre-history. Hamlet wants to find out the truth by instructing the actors to perform a play which contains striking similarities to the alleged murder of Hamlet's father. The embedded performance thus includes details from the broader plot, which illuminates a thematic aspect of the play itself.

=== Short story: "The Fall of the House of Usher" by Edgar A. Poe ===
The Fall of the House of Usher by Edgar Allan Poe sports a particularly noteworthy example of mise en abyme, a story within a story. Towards the end of the story, the narrator begins to read aloud parts of an antique volume entitled Mad Trist by Sir Launcelot Canning. At first, the narrator only vaguely realizes that the sounds occurring in the embedded fiction Mad Trist can really be heard by him. The embedded story is subsequently more and more intertwined with the events that are happening in the embedding story, until, in a climactic scene, a supposedly dead and buried member of the House of Usher (Madeline), is about to enter the room where the recital takes place when both she and her incestuously beloved brother die in a final embrace. This fall (and the partial mirroring of the scene in Mad Trist) anticipates the final fall of the House of Usher, which sinks into the tarn surrounding the building.

=== TV series: The Simpsons ===
In The Simpsons the characters frequently watch television: characters of a TV series are thus watching TV themselves. This act is a mise en abyme, as we see a film within a film. However, if they started discussing what they are watching it would also be an instance of meta-reference (or rather the mise en abyme would, as it sometimes does, have triggered metareferential reflections). Yet, as a rule, mise en abyme merely ‘mirrors’ elements from a superior level on a subordinate one, but does not necessarily trigger an analysis of them.

== Potential problems ==
Mise en abyme can be easily confused with metalepsis and metareference. These terms describe related features, as mise en abyme can be a springboard to metalepsis if there is a paradoxical confusion of the levels involved. If the artificiality of the mirroring device or related issues are foregrounded or discussed, mise en abyme can also be conducive to metareference.

To summarise, mise en abyme is a form of similarity, repetition and hence a variant of self-reference that is not necessarily discussed within its appearing medium, it only occurs. If the occurrence is discussed, or if mise en abyme triggers reflections on the respective medium or the construction of the text for example, mise en abyme is combined with metareference.
