= Meta (prefix) =

Prefix in English derived from Greek

Meta (from Ancient Greek μετά (metá) 'after, beyond') is an adjective meaning 'more comprehensive' or 'transcending'.

In modern nomenclature, the prefix meta can also serve as a prefix meaning self-referential, as a field of study or endeavor (metatheory: theory about a theory; metamathematics: mathematical theories about mathematics; meta-axiomatics or meta-axiomaticity: axioms about axiomatic systems; metahumor: joking about the ways humor is expressed; etc.).

== Original Greek meaning ==
In Greek, the prefix meta- is generally less esoteric than in English; Greek meta- is equivalent to the Latin words post- or ad-. The use of the prefix in this sense occurs occasionally in scientific English terms derived from Greek. For example, the term Metatheria (the name for the clade of marsupial mammals) uses the prefix meta- in the sense that the Metatheria occur on the tree of life adjacent to the Eutheria (the placental mammals).

== Epistemology ==
In epistemology, and often in common use, the prefix meta- is used to mean 'about (its own category)'. For example, metadata is data about data (who has produced them, when, what format the data are in and so on). In a database, metadata is also data about data stored in a data dictionary, describing information (data) about database tables such as the table name, table owner, details about columns, etc. – essentially describing the table. In psychology, metamemory refers to an individual's knowledge about whether or not they would remember something if they concentrated on recalling it. The modern sense of "an X about X" has given rise to concepts like "meta-cognition" (cognition about cognition), "meta-emotion" (emotion about emotion), "meta-discussion" (discussion about discussion), "meta-joke" (joke about jokes), and "metaprogramming" (writing programs about writing programs). In a rule-based system, a metarule is a rule governing the application of other rules.

"Metagaming", accordingly, refers to games about games. However, it has a different meaning depending on the context. In role-playing games, this means that someone with a higher level of knowledge is playing; that is, that the player incorporates factors that are outside the actual framework of the game – the player has knowledge that was not acquired through experiencing the game, but through external sources. This type of metagaming is often frowned upon in many role-playing game communities because it impairs game balance and equality of opportunity. Metagaming can also refer to a game that is used to create or change the rules while playing a game. One can play this type of metagame and choose which rules apply during the game itself, potentially changing the level of difficulty. Such metagames include campaign role-playing games like Halo 3. Complex card or board games, e.g. poker or chess, are also often referred to as metagames. According to Nigel Howard, this type of metagame is defined as a decision-making process that is derived from the analysis of possible outcomes in relation to external variables that change a problem.

== Abstraction and self-reference ==
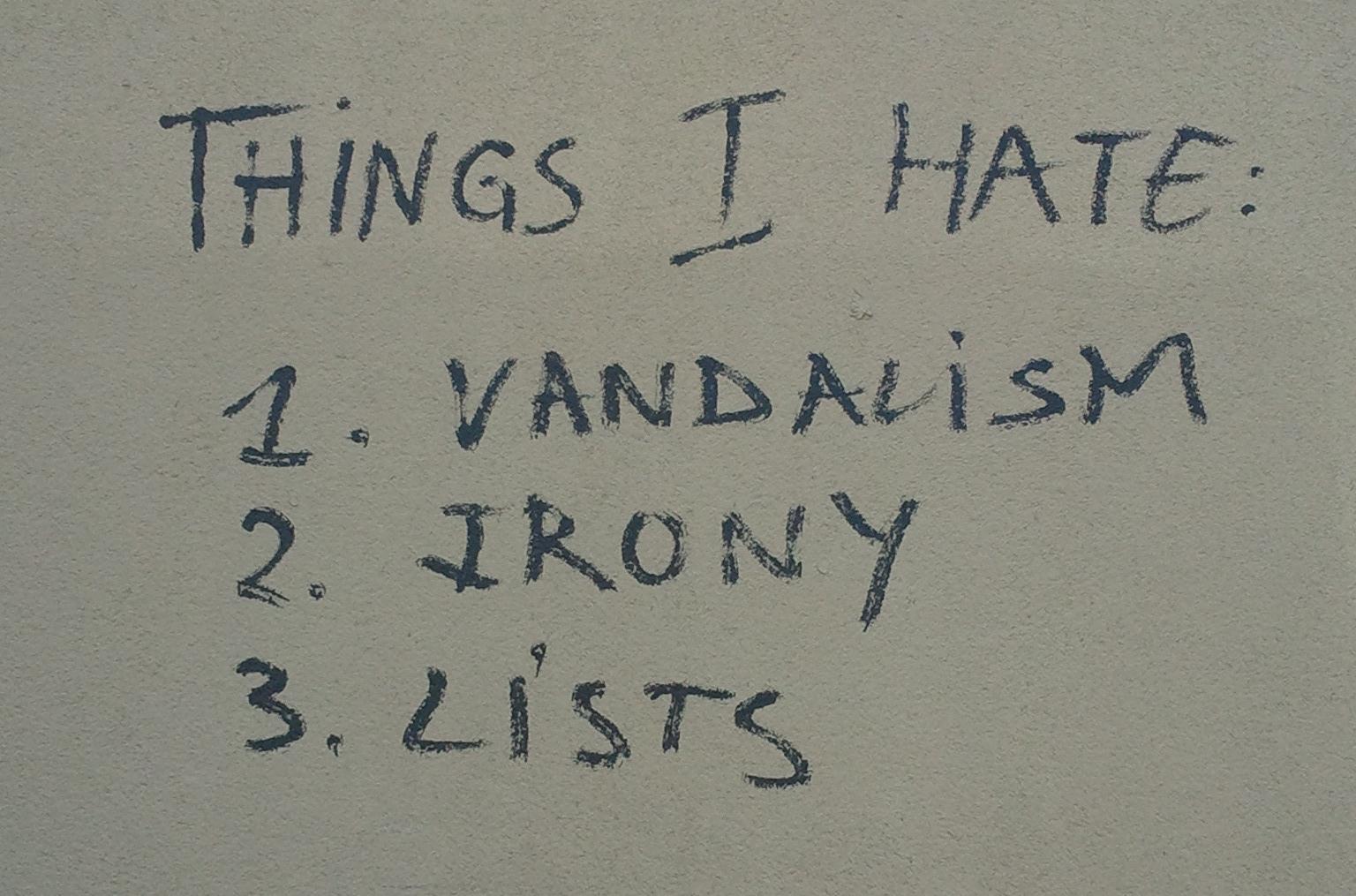
An example of self-referential humor on a wall in Paris, which requires an understanding of both the text and the transcending context through which the text is read

Any subject can be said to have a metatheory, a theoretical consideration of its properties – such as its foundations, methods, form, and utility – on a higher level of abstraction. In linguistics, grammar is considered to be a metalanguage: a language operating on a higher level to describe properties of the plain language, and not itself.

== Etymology ==
The prefix comes from the Greek preposition and prefix meta- (μετα-), from μετά, which typically means "after", "beside", "with" or "among". Other meanings include "beyond", "adjacent" and "self", and it is also used in the forms μετ- before vowels and μεθ- "meth-" before aspirated vowels.

The earliest form of the word "meta" is the Mycenaean Greek me-ta, written in Linear B syllabic script. The Greek preposition is cognate with the Old English preposition mid "with", still found as a prefix in midwife. Its use in English is the result of back-formation from the word "metaphysics". In origin Metaphysics was just the title of one of the principal works of Aristotle; it was so named (by Andronicus of Rhodes) because in the customary ordering of the works of Aristotle it was the book following Physics; it thus meant nothing more than "[the book that comes] after [the book entitled] Physics". However, even Latin writers misinterpreted this as entailing metaphysics constituted "the science of what is beyond the physical". Nonetheless, Aristotle's Metaphysics enunciates considerations of a nature above physical reality, which one can examine through certain philosophy – for example, such a thing as an unmoved mover. The use of the prefix was later extended to other contexts, based on the understanding of metaphysics as meaning "the science of what is beyond the physical".

== Early use in English ==
The Oxford English Dictionary cites uses of the meta- prefix as "beyond, about" (such as meta-economics and meta-philosophy) going back to 1917. However, these formations are parallel to the original "metaphysics" and "metaphysical", that is, as a prefix to general nouns (fields of study) or adjectives. Going by the OED citations, it began being used with specific nouns in connection with mathematical logic sometime before 1929. (In 1920 David Hilbert proposed a research project in what was called "metamathematics.")

A notable early citation is W. V. O. Quine's 1937 use of the word "metatheorem", where meta- has the modern meaning of "an X about X".

Douglas Hofstadter, in his 1979 book Gödel, Escher, Bach (and in the 1985 sequel, Metamagical Themas), popularized this meaning of the term. The book, which deals with self-reference and strange loops, and touches on Quine and his work, was influential in many computer-related subcultures and may be responsible for the popularity of the prefix, for its use as a solo term, and for the many recent coinages which use it. Hofstadter uses meta as a stand-alone word, as an adjective, and as a directional preposition ("going meta," a term he coins for the old rhetorical trick of taking a debate or analysis to another level of abstraction, as when somebody says "This debate isn't going anywhere"). This book may also be responsible for the association of "meta" with strange loops, as opposed to just abstraction. According to Hofstadter, it is about self-reference, which means a sentence, idea or formula refers to itself. The Merriam-Webster Dictionary describes it as "showing or suggesting an explicit awareness of itself or oneself as a member of its category: cleverly self-referential". The sentence "This sentence contains thirty-six letters," and the sentence which embeds it, are examples of "metasentences" referencing themselves in this way. As maintained in the book Gödel, Escher, Bach, a strange loop is given if different logical statements or theories are put together in contradiction, thus distorting the meaning and generating logical paradoxes. One example is the liar paradox, a paradox in philosophy or logic that arises when a sentence claims its own falsehood (or untruth); for instance: "This sentence is not true." Until the beginning of the 20th century, this kind of paradox was a considerable problem for a philosophical theory of truth. Alfred Tarski solved this difficulty by proving that such paradoxes do not exist with a consistent separation of object language and metalanguage. "For every formalized language, a formally correct and factually applicable definition of the true statement can be constructed in the metalanguage with the sole help of expressions of a general-logical character, expressions of the language itself and of terms from the morphology of the language, but on the condition that the metalanguage is of a higher order than the language that is the subject of the investigation."

== In gaming ==
Metagaming is a general term describing an approach to playing a game as optimally as possible within its current rules. The shorthand meta has been backronymed as "Most Effective Tactics Available" to tersely explain the concept.

In the world of competitive games, rule imprecisions and non-goal oriented play are not commonplace. As a result, the extent of metagaming narrows down mostly to studying strategies of top players and exploiting commonly used strategies for an advantage. Those may evolve as updates are released or new, better, strategies are discovered by top players. The opposite metagame of playing a relatively unknown strategy for surprisal is often called off-meta.

This usage is particularly common in games that have large, organized play systems or tournament circuits. Some examples of this kind of environment are tournament scenes for tabletop or computer collectible card games like Magic: The Gathering, tabletop war-gaming such as Warhammer 40,000, or team-based multiplayer online games such as Dota 2.

The metagame in these environments is often affected by new elements added by the game's developers and publishers, such as new card expansions in card games, or adjustments to character abilities in online games. The metagame may also come within player communities as reactions to win over currently-popular strategies, creating ebbs and flows of strategy types over time.

== See also ==
- Benzene § Nomenclature
- Fourth wall
- Metaverse
