= Hypostasis (literature) =

Literary device in metafiction

Hypostasis (from Greek hypo- "below" + stasis "standing") is the essence of metafiction, a rare, literary moment when characters in fiction become aware of their own fictional nature.

== Debut ==
The debut of hypostasis in literature occurs in Don Quixote, Part 2, Chapter 2, when Sancho announces to Don Quixote that a book has been written about their adventures. Thus, these literary characters become aware that they are literary characters. This scene so impressed Jorge Luis Borges that he devoted one of his most famous essays to it: Partial Enchantments in the Quixote.'"

== Modern use ==
In Disney's 1977 animated movie, The Many Adventures of Winnie the Pooh, Tigger bounces himself to the top of a tree and is then afraid to climb down. This image of Tigger in the treetop is revealed to the viewer to be merely an illustration in a book when Sebastian Cabot, the movie's narrator, says, "Well Tigger, your bouncing really got you into trouble this time." Tigger, surrounded by the words of the story on the page around him, looks directly into the camera and says, "Say, who are you?" "I'm the narrator," answers Cabot. "Well please, for goodness' sakes, narrate me down from here!" pleads Tigger.

Cartoonist Bill Watterson of Calvin and Hobbes bridges into hypostasis in 1992 when Calvin, a cartoon, draws a cartoon of himself and then criticizes his own lack of ability to draw.

A notable excursion into hypostasis is featured in Tom Stoppard's screenplay for the 1990 movie, Rosencrantz and Guildenstern Are Dead, in which two minor characters from Shakespeare's Hamlet wrestle with the growing realization that they are undifferentiated minor characters in a work of fiction.

== See also ==
- Hypostasis (linguistics)
- Fourth wall
- Self-reference
- Meta-reference
