= Meta-discussion =

Discussion of discussion

The term meta-discussion means a discussion whose subject is a discussion. Meta-discussion explores such issues as the style of a discussion, its participants, the setting in which the discussion occurs, and the relationship of the discussion to other discussions on the same or different topics. It is one of many terms based on the inferred meaning of the "meta-" prefix. The etymology for the prefix dates back to use of Metaphysics as the title of the treatise by Aristotle that came after his works on physics in the traditional ordering of his books. The fundamental meaning of the prefix in Greek is simply "after." The modern, inferred meaning of a higher-order, self-referential consideration of the nature of an activity—rather than actual, first-level participation in the activity—has led to many neologisms such as Meta-Wiki.

== Examples ==
One of the most easily understood examples of meta-discussion occurs in the criticism of a literary work, such as a novel. On-topic discussion of a novel, rather than meta-discussion, would include such things as the consideration of a particular character, examination of incidents in the plot, or exploration of the general themes of the book. For instance, writing or talking about the unnamed governess in Henry James' The Turn of the Screw would constitute on-topic, first-level discussion.

As it happens, published commentary about the governess has reached enormous proportions. So significant meta-discussion about such first-order criticism has arisen. Literary critic Edmund Wilson, for instance, offered various theories about the governess and other aspects of The Turn of the Screw over the years, as other critics influenced him to recant or modify his views. As a result, substantial discussion of Wilson's commentary on the book has occurred. This constitutes a classic example of meta-discussion based on Wilson's original, first-order examination of James' book.

Other examples of meta-discussion often occur on Usenet or other Internet-based discussion forums. Frequently, contributors to these forums will complain about the tone of the discussion, the personalities of other contributors as supposedly revealed in the conversation, the inability to stick to the topic at hand, or comparisons of the discussion to conversations elsewhere on the Internet. All these constitute meta-discussion based on first-order Internet conversations about a particular topic.

== Characteristics ==
Meta-discussion does not mean a simple change of subject. If all those conversing about a particular subject suddenly start exploring another subject, no meta-discussion has taken place. In fact, such a shift or attempted shift in subject matter will often provoke meta-discussion about contributors not sticking to the topic or trying to avoid issues in the original discussion.

In fact, it may be a relatively rare occurrence that any substantial, extended discussion of a subject does not include at least some meta-discussion. Simple requests for a contributor to pay attention or to let others be heard are very common examples of meta-discussion in both face-to-face conversation and written communication.

== Evaluation ==
Meta-discussion may seem artificial and even a waste of time. Especially in debates and other adversarial discussions, some participants may believe that their opponents are trying to evade consideration of the issues at hand by recourse to meta-discussion. This often leads to comments like "stick to the subject" or "answer the question," which are themselves meta-discussion, though of a simple variety.

Still, it may sometimes be valuable to explore the higher-order issues about a discussion rather than the subject of the discussion itself. Tactful consideration of personality issues with some contributors as revealed in a discussion may lead to better insight and calmer exploration of the primary topic of the conversation.
