= Hypostasis (linguistics) =

Relationship between a name and a quantity

In linguistics, a hypostasis (from the Greek word ὑπόστασις meaning foundation, base or that which stands behind) is a relationship between a name and a known quantity, as a cultural personification (i.e. objectification with personality) of an entity or quality. It often connotes the personification of typically elemental powers, such as wind and fire, or human life, fertility, and death. In descriptive linguistics, the term was first introduced by Leonard Bloomfield to account for uses of synsemantic words as autosemantic in sentences such as I'm tired of your ifs and buts. In this sense, the usage meaning of the word is referred to as a whole.

The term hypostasis is considered to be scientifically and culturally neutral, for the purpose of describing name-to-term relationships that, within religion and theology, might be termed a "deification", or otherwise by the more pejorative "idolatry". The concept of "hypostasis" functions as a kind of conceptual inverse for terms which may have originated as personal names, and have linguistically evolved to become common terms for general concepts and qualities.

== See also ==
- Hypostasis (literature)
