= Holding current (electronics) =

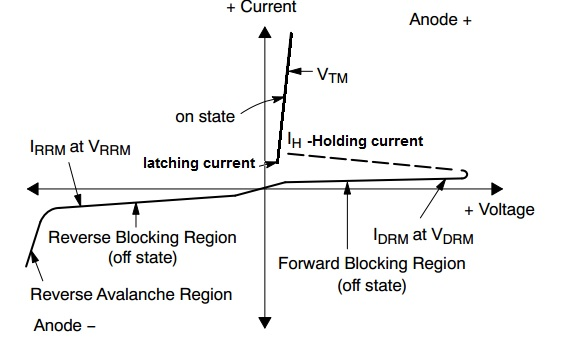
The latching current in less than the holding current.

The holding current (hypostatic) for electrical, electromagnetic, and electronic devices is the minimum current which must pass through a circuit in order for it to remain in the 'ON' state. The term can be applied to a single switch or to an entire device. A simple example of holding current is in a Spark gap.

In the most basic of circuits, if the current falls below the holding current even briefly, the circuit is turned 'OFF' (becomes blocked). However, complex circuits and devices may have different delays built-in between the time the current falls below this level and the time the device turns 'OFF'. Whether a device turns 'ON' when current is restored is a design issue. The current necessary to restore the circuit to the 'ON' state, called the "threshold current" (See threshold voltage), may be much greater than the holding current, or only very slightly more. Nevertheless, where the device is designed to turn back 'ON' upon restoration of the current and where the device is running at or about the holding current level, slight variations in the current can cause flicker as the device cycles 'OFF' and 'ON'. If flicker is undesirable, it can be reduced by the use of capacitors or other circuits, on the other hand, flicker can be used to measure small events as in a Geiger–Müller tube.

A related term is latching current, which is the minimum additional current that can make up for any missing input (gate) current in order to keep the device 'ON', in other words, to keep the device's internal structure latched.

== See also ==
- Silicon controlled rectifier (SCR), a device for maintaining a holding current
- Thyristor, a device for maintaining a holding current
- TRIAC, a device that can conduct current in either direction when it is turned on
