= Alta Trinità beata =

13th-century Catholic hymn to the Trinity in Italian language

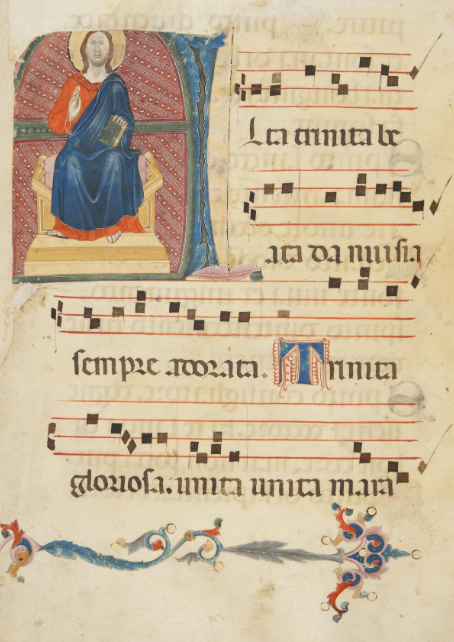
- Enluminated Gregorian manuscript of the Trinitarian hymn in the Laudario of Florence
- English: High and Blessed Trinity
- Period: Middle Ages / Early Italian Renaissance
- Genre: Lauda / Motet
- Form: SATB
- Written: Anonymous
- Language: Italian
- Duration: 1'30"

Alta Trinità Beata is an anonymous Italian hymn from the 13th century, belonging to the genre of the lauda spiritual, though sometimes classified as a motet. This four-voice polyphonic composition (SATB), performed without instrumental accompaniment, celebrates the Holy Trinity through a text in vernacular Italian. Known for its simplicity and melodic beauty, it is considered one of the most emblematic sacred works of the late Middle Ages and early Renaissance music.

== History ==
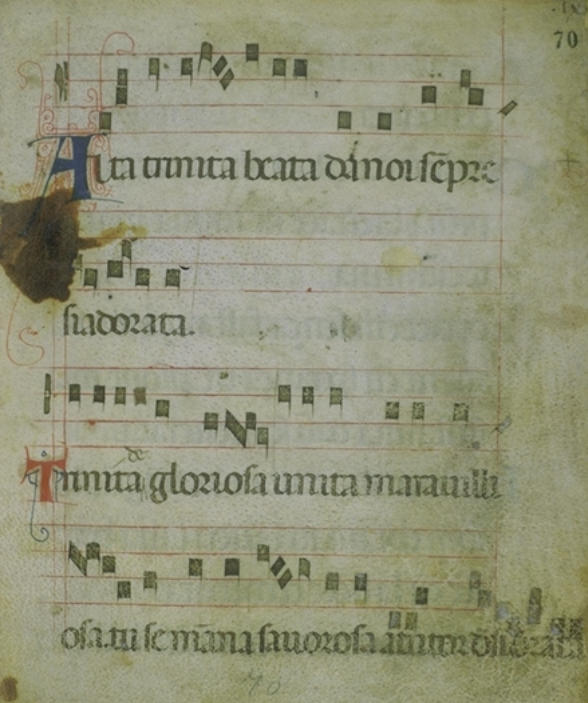
An extract from the Laudario of Cortone showing the Trinitarian hymn shows the earliest known version of the text, but a rather different melody from the one sung today in polyphony.

Alta Trinità Beata is an anonymous work, likely composed in Italy during the 13th century, within the context of the Laudi Spirituali, a popular genre of devotional songs in the vernacular. These laudes, often sung by religious confraternities or the faithful during processions, stood apart from the more formal Latin motets of official liturgy. The oldest score is found in the Laudario of Cortona (1290) and the text is repeated with a significantly different melody in the Laudario of Florence, a collection of manuscripts of Lodi Spirituali dating back to 1336 preserved as MS. II. 1. 122 at the National Central Library of Florence. Despite a misreading that altered the title to Alla Trinità Beata, the first known publication of the score occurred in 1782, in Charles Burney's General History of Music in London. The music later influenced English-language hymns across the Atlantic, such as the hymn for the feast of the blessed martyrs (Blessed Feasts of Blessed Martyrs). In Europe, the hymn was revived after the French Revolution through historical concerts organized by François-Joseph Fétis in Paris in 1830.

The work is rooted in the tradition of laudi spirituali, which thrived in Florence and other Italian cities at the end of the Middle Ages. Its simple polyphonic style, akin to cantus figuralis, prefigures later Protestant chorales. It continues to inspire modern composers, such as Jouni Kaipainen, who created a new harmonization in 1994.

Though the author remains unknown, the text and music reflect the influence of devotional movements, particularly those celebrating the Holy Trinity.

== Text and Structure ==
The text of Alta Trinità Beata is a praise to the Holy Trinity, written in medieval Italian with a rhymed structure. An excerpt of the original text, where only the first stanza is commonly used today, includes two additional stanzas from the Laudario of Florence:

Alta Trinità beata, da noi semper adorata,
Trinità gloriosa, unità maravigliosa,
Tu sei manna saporosa e tutta desiderosa.

— High and holy Trinity, always adored by us,
Glorious Trinity, wonderful unity,
You are the savory manna and fully desired.

Da' a nui, maiestade eterna,
deitate sempiterna,
la citade k'è superna
chiaramante illuminata.
Noi credemo sanza fallanza,
amamente, cum speranza,
tre persone, una substantza,
dalli sancti venerata.

— Eternal Majesty,
everlasting deity,
give us the celestial city,
brightly illuminated.
We believe without doubt,
firmly and with hope,
in three persons, one substance,
worshipped by the saints.

The composition features two repeated sections without variations, a hallmark of laudes from that era. The melody, written in the sixth gregorian of devotus mode and harmonized in F major, is simple and accessible, designed for a mixed choir (SATB) without instrumental accompaniment, reflecting its use in popular devotional settings. This melodic simplicity and clear text contribute to its emotional impact, often described as "touching the hearts".

== Musical Importance ==
Alta Trinità Beata serves as a bridge between medieval sacred music and the polyphonic forms of the Renaissance. Its style, reminiscent of cantus figuralis, blends simple popular melodies with modest polyphony, which later influenced Protestant chorales. This piece highlights the evolution of musical practices in Italian religious confraternities, where music functioned as both prayer and an educational tool for the faithful.

The composition has been widely performed and arranged, notably for modern vocal ensembles. Instrumental versions also exist, such as an arrangement for brass ensemble used in religious concerts.

== Liturgical and Cultural Use ==
Alta Trinità Beata is traditionally linked to the Feast of the Holy Trinity, observed the first Sunday after Pentecost in Western Christian liturgy. Its text, focused on praising the Holy Trinity, makes it a favored choice for liturgical services dedicated to this mystery. In Lutheran and Catholic communities, the work is occasionally included in celebrations, though it is more frequently featured in concerts of sacred music.

Beyond its liturgical role, the hymn carries significant cultural weight. It is regularly performed by modern choirs, such as the Dresden Choir and the Divina Musica ensemble, and is available on platforms like Spotify. Its enduring popularity stems from its simplicity and expressiveness, attracting a diverse audience from early music enthusiasts to those seeking spiritual connection.
